This is a list of films and miniseries that are based on actual events. All films on this list are from American production unless indicated otherwise.

2010 
 22 Bullets (French: L'Immortel) (2010) – French gangster-action film telling a part of the life story of Jacky Imbert
 71: Into the Fire (2010) – South Korean war drama film based on a true story of a group of 71 under-trained and under-armed, outgunned student-soldiers of South Korea during the Korean War, who were mostly killed on August 11, 1950, during the Battle of P'ohang-dong
 127 Hours (2010) – based on the story of Aron Ralston, the American mountain climber who amputated his own arm to free himself after being trapped by a boulder for six days in Bluejohn Canyon in 2003
 All Good Things (2010) – inspired by the life of accused murderer Robert Durst, the film chronicles the life of the wealthy son of a New York real estate tycoon, a series of murders linked to him, and his volatile relationship with his wife and her subsequent unsolved disappearance 
 Amish Grace (2010) – television film based on the 2006 West Nickel Mines School shooting at Nickel Mines, Pennsylvania, and the spirit of forgiveness the Amish community demonstrated in its aftermath
 Angel of Evil (Italian: Vallanzasca – Gli angeli del male) (2010) – Italian crime film about Italian bank robber and mobster Renato Vallanzasca
 Animal Kingdom (2010) – Australian crime drama film inspired by events which involved the Pettingill criminal family of Melbourne
 Antardwand (2010) – Indian film based on the cases of groom kidnapping reported in Bihar in India
 The Assault (2010) – French action thriller film based on the 1994 hijacking of Air France Flight 8969 by Algerian Islamic fundamentalist terrorists and the raid to free the hostages by the GIGN, the elite counter-terrorism unit of the French National Gendarmerie
 The Bang Bang Club (2010) – Canadian/South African film based on the lives of four photojournalists active within the townships of South Africa during apartheid, especially between 1990 and 1994
 Belgrano (2010) – Argentine biographical drama based on the life of the Argentine national hero Manuel Belgrano
 Beneath Hill 60 (2010) – Australian war drama set during World War I, the film tells the story of the 1st Australian Tunnelling Company's efforts in mining underneath Hill 60 in the Ypres Salient on the Western Front, during the war, a series of mines filled with explosive charges were placed beneath the German lines to aid the advance of British troops
 Black Venus (2010) – French drama based on the life of Sarah Baartman, a Khoikhoi woman who in the early 19th century was exhibited in Europe under the name "Hottentot Venus"
 Blood Done Sign My Name (2010) – drama film based on the autobiographical book Blood Done Sign My Name (2004) by historian Timothy Tyson
 Bond of Silence (2010) – television drama film based on the 1997 Murder of Bob Hutchinson in Squamish, British Columbia
 Bonded by Blood (2010) – British film loosely based on the Rettendon murders in 1995
 Bruce Lee, My Brother (2010) – based on the life of Bruce Lee from his teenage years through part of his adult years
 Burke & Hare (2010) – British black comedy film, loosely based on the Burke and Hare murders in 1828
 Carlos (2010) – French/German biographical three-part television miniseries about the life of the 1970s Venezuelan terrorist Carlos the Jackal 
 Casino Jack (2010) – comedy-drama thriller film focusing on the career of Washington, D.C. lobbyist and businessman Jack Abramoff, who was involved in a massive corruption scandal that led to his conviction as well as the conviction of two White House officials
 Caterpillar (2010) – Japanese drama, a critique of the right-wing militarist nationalism that guided Japan's conduct in Asia during the Second Sino-Japanese War and World War II
 Chico Xavier (2010) – Brazilian drama film about the Brazilian medium Chico Xavier
 The Client List (2010) – made-for-television drama based on the Odessa, Texas prostitution scandal of 2004
 The Clinic (2010) – Australian horror thriller film following six abducted women and their newborn babies, according to the poster it's "inspired by true events"
 Cold Fish (2010) – Japanese film about a quiet and unambitious owner of a tropical fish shop whose life and family are taken over by a fellow fish entrepreneur who happens to be a serial killer, the film is loosely based on the exploits of two Tokyo serial killers, Sekine Gen and Hiroko Kazama, a husband and wife duo who owned a pet shop and murdered at least four people
 Confucius (Chinese: 	孔子) (2010) – Chinese biographical drama film depicting the life of Confucius
 The Conspirator (2010) – mystery Historical drama film telling the story of Mary Sturratt, the only female conspirator charged in the assassination of Abraham Lincoln and the first woman to be executed by the United States federal government
 Conviction (2010) – legal drama based on the story of a single mother, Betty Anne Waters, who goes to law school so she can become her brother Kenny's attorney after Kenny is wrongly convicted of murder
 Cornelis (2010) – Swedish biographical drama film about the life of the musician Cornelis Vreeswijk
 Crook (2010) – Indian Hindi-language action thriller film based on the controversy regarding the allegedly racial attacks on Indian students in Australia between 2007 and 2010
 Cyrus: Mind of a Serial Killer (2010) – thriller horror film based on real events regarding a serial killer by the name of Cyrus
 D.C. Sniper (2010) – direct-to-video drama thriller based on the Beltway sniper attacks of October 2002 committed by John Allen Muhammad and Lee Boyd Malvo
 Dear Mr. Gacy (2010) – Canadian drama thriller based on the book The Last Victim by Jason Moss
 Eat Pray Love (2010) – biographical romantic drama film starring Julia Roberts as Elizabeth Gilbert, based on Gilbert's 2006 memoir of the same name
 The End Is My Beginning (German: Das Ende ist mein Anfang) (2010) – German-Italian biographical drama based on the posthumous autobiographical best-seller with the same name written by Tiziano Terzani
 The Experiment (2010) – drama thriller film about an experiment which resembles Philip Zimbardo's Stanford prison experiment in 1971, the film is a remake of the 2001 German film Das Experiment
 Extraordinary Measures (2010) – medical drama based on the story of John Crowley and Aileen Crowley, whose children have Pompe disease
 Fair Game (2010) – biographical political drama film based on Valerie Plame's 2007 memoir Fair Game and Joseph C. Wilson's 2004 memoir The Politics of Truth
 The Fighter (2010) – based on the life of boxer Micky Ward and his half-brother, Dicky Eklund
 The First Grader (2010) – biographical drama film based on the true story of Kimani Maruge, a Kenyan farmer who enrolled in elementary school at the age of 84 following the Kenyan government's announcement of free universal primary education in 2003
 Fortress of War (2010) – Russian/Belarusian war film recounting the June 1941 defense of Brest Fortress against invading Wehrmacht forces in the opening stages of Operation Barbarossa, Nazi Germany's invasion of the Soviet Union during World War II
 Frankie & Alice (2010) – Canadian drama film based on a true story about a popular go-go dancer/stripper in the 1970s who has dissociative identity disorder
 Gainsbourg: A Heroic Life (French: Gainsbourg (Vie héroïque)) (2010) – French drama based on the life of French singer Serge Gainsbourg
 Green Zone (2010) – British-French-American war thriller depicting the events from the end of the invasion phase of the 2003 invasion of Iraq until the transfer of power to the Iraqis
 The Hammer (a.k.a. Hamill) (2010) – biographical film about Matt Hamill, a deaf wrestler and mixed martial artist
 Hidalgo: La historia jamás contada (2010) – Mexican film about Miguel Hidalgo y Costilla and his part in the Mexican War of Independence
 Holly Rollers (2010) – independent crime film drama film inspired by a true story of a young Hasidic man who was lured into the world of international drug trafficking in the late 1990s
 Howl (2010) – biographical film exploring both the 1955 Six Gallery debut and the 1957 obscenity trial of 20th-century American poet Allen Ginsberg's noted poem "Howl"
 Ip Man 2 (2010) – Hong Kong film based on the life of Ip Man, a grandmaster of the martial art Wing Chun, and the story of him in Hong Kong
 Iron Lord (Russian: Ярослав. Тысячу лет назад) (2010) – Russian historical film telling the true story of Yaroslav the Wise 
 Janie Jones (2010) – drama film written and directed by David M. Rosenthal, about a fading, alcoholic rock star meeting his daughter for the first time after being left by her drugged-up mother, and the growing relationship they have while on tour, Rosenthal based the film's storyline on his real-life meeting with his own daughter
 Jew Suss: Rise and Fall (2010) – German Historical drama film about Austrian actor Ferdinand Marian
 Kajínek (2010) – Czech action drama film based on the story of Jiří Kajínek, who managed to escape from a strictly guarded prison in the Mírov fortress
 Khelein Hum Jee Jaan Sey (2010) – Indian Hindi movie based on Chittagong uprising of 1930
 King of Devil's Island (2010) – French/Norwegian action drama film based on true events that occurred at Bastøy Prison in Norway
 The Kingdom of Solomon (Persian: ملک سلیمان)(2010) – Iranian religious historical film based on the Islamic accounts of Solomon's prophetic life extracted from the Qur'an
 The King's Speech (2010) – historical British drama based on King George VI, who suffered from a severe stammer
 The Legend Is Born: Ip Man (2010) – Hong Kong biographical martial arts film based on the early life of the Wing Chun grandmaster Ip Man
 Leonie (2010) – biographical film based on Léonie Gilmour
 Letters to God (2010) – based on the true story of Tyler Doughtie, an 8-year-old suffering from cancer with a love of writing and sending letters to God
 Lope (2010) – Spanish–Brazilian adventure drama film inspired in the youth of Lope de Vega
 Lost Loves (2010) – Cambodian drama film about Leav Sila, one of countless people that struggled to survive during the years of the Khmer Rouge regime
 Love Ranch (2010) – drama film based on the lives of Joe Conforte and Sally Conforte, a married couple who operated the first legal brothel in the United States, the Mustang Ranch in Storey County, Nevada
 Made in Dagenham (2010) – British film dramatizing the Ford sewing machinists strike of 1968 that aimed for equal pay for women 
 Mahler on the Couch (German: Mahler auf der Couch) (2010) – German historical drama film depicting an affair between Alma Mahler and Walter Gropius, and the subsequent psychoanalysis of Mahler's husband Gustav Mahler by Sigmund Freud
 Malik Ek (2010) – Hindi spiritual film on Sai Baba of Shirdi
 Max Schmeling (2010) – German biographical film telling the story of German boxing icon Max Schmeling
 Meek's Cutoff (2010) – western film loosely based on a historical incident on the Oregon Trail in 1845, in which frontier guide Stephen Meek led a wagon train on an ill-fated journey through the Oregon desert along the route later known as the Meek Cutoff in the western United States
 Montevideo, God Bless You! (2010) – based on the events leading to the participation of the Yugoslavia national football team at the first FIFA World Cup in Montevideo, Uruguay in July 1930
 Mr. Nice (2010) – loosely based on the Welsh former drug smuggler turned author, Howard Marks, who achieved notoriety through high-profile court cases
 My Name Is Khan (2010) – Indian Hindi-language drama film centering on Rizwan Khan, an autistic Muslim man who tries to meet the President of the United States and convince him that he is not a terrorist to win his wife back
 Nanga Parbat (2010) – German mountaineering movie about Reinhold and Günther Messner, who climbed Nanga Parbat
 Nokas (2010) – Norwegian heist film portraying the real life NOKAS robbery that took place in Stavanger, Norway in 2004
 Of Gods and Men (2010) – based on the assassination of the monks of Tibhirine
 Once Upon a Time in Mumbai (2010) – Indian Hindi-language gangster film loosely based on the lives of Mumbai underworld gangsters Haji Mastan and Dawood Ibrahim
 Oranges and Sunshine (2010) – Australian drama based on the book Empty Cradles by Margaret Humphreys
 Picco (2010) – German crime film about the torture murder in the Siegburg correctional facility in autumn 2006
 Piché: The Landing of a Man (French: Piché, entre ciel et terre) (2010) – Canadian drama film based on the true story of Robert Piché, an airline pilot who successfully landed Air Transat Flight 236 in the Azores after the plane lost engine power mid-air
 The Pregnancy Pact (2010) – made-for-television film based on the allegedly true story of a 2008 media circus surrounding a large group of teen girls at the Gloucester High School, Gloucester, Massachusetts, who allegedly agreed to concurrently get pregnant, give birth and raise their children communally
 Rakta Charitra (2010) – Indian trilingual (Telugu, Hindi, and Tamil) biographical crime film based on the life of political leader and factionist Paritala Ravindra
 Rasputin (2010) – Italian film about Grigori Rasputin
 Restless Heart: The Confessions of Saint Augustine (Italian: Sant'Agostino) (2010) – Italian miniseries chronicling the life of St. Augustine, the early Christian theologian, writer and Bishop of Hippo Regius at the time of the Vandal invasion (AD 430)
 Revolución: El cruce de los Andes (a.k.a. San Martín: El cruce de Los Andes) (2010) – Argentine historical epic film that follows the life of José de San Martín, with focus on the Crossing on the Andes
 Risen (2010) – Welsh sports drama biographical film about the Welsh boxer Howard Winstone
 The Road to Coronation Street (2010) – British dramatization of the creation of Coronation Street, the UK's longest-running television soap opera, from conception to its first transmission in December 1960
 The Robber (German: Der Räuber) (2010) – German drama based on a novel by Austrian author Martin Prinz the novel's character is based on Austrian bank-robber and runner Johann Kastenberger
 The Round Up (French: La Rafle) (2010) – French film based on the true story of a young Jewish boy, the film depicts the Vel' d'Hiv Roundup (Rafle du Vel' d'Hiv), the mass arrest of Jews by French police who were accomplices of Nazi Germans in Paris in July 1942
 The Runaways (2010) – drama based on the 1970s all-girl rock band The Runaways, focusing in particular on the relationship between rockers Cherie Currie and Joan Jett, adapted from Currie's memoir
 The Secret Diaries of Miss Anne Lister (2010) – made-for-television biographical historical drama film about 19th-century Yorkshire landowner Anne Lister
 Secretariat (2010) – based on the story of a Thoroughbred named Secretariat, who won the Triple Crown in the Belmont Stakes and still holds the record after 37 years, and his owner, Penny Chenery
 Sex & Drugs & Rock & Roll (2010) – British biographical film about English new wave musician Ian Dury
 The Silent House (Spanish: La Casa Muda) (2010) – Uruguayan Spanish-language horror film allegedly inspired by real events that took place in the 1940s
 The Social Network (2010) – based on the creation, and lawsuits of Facebook
 Space Dogs (Russian: Белка и Стрелка. Звёздные собаки) (2010) – Russian computer-animated adventure comedy film based on the Soviet space dogs Belka and Strelka
 The Special Relationship (2010) – American/British political film based on relationship between British Prime Minister Tony Blair and U.S. President Bill Clinton
 Striker (2010) – Bollywood action drama film set in a Mumbai ghetto in the mid-1980s, a story of triumph and human spirit over indomitable odds
 Temple Grandin (2010) – biographical film about Temple Grandin, a woman with autism who revolutionized practices for the inhumane handling of livestock on cattle ranches and slaughterhouses
 Times You Change (German: Zeiten ändern dich) (2010) – German biographical film based on Bushido's 2008 autobiography
 Unstoppable (2010) – action thriller loosely based on the CSX 8888 incident, which tells the story of a runaway train carrying hazardous material, which puts cities and people in danger
 Veda (2010) – Turkish biographical film based on the memoirs of Salih Bozok, which traces the life of Mustafa Kemal Atatürk
 The Way Back (2010) – true story of seven men who escape from prison in Siberia (after being held by Stalin), then walk through the Gobi Desert, Himalayas and all the way to Sikkim, India
 When Love Is Not Enough: The Lois Wilson Story (2010) – made-for-television  biographical film based on Lois Wilson and the true story of her husband's alcoholism and her subsequent finding of Al-Anon
 The Whistleblower (2010) – thriller which tells the story of Kathryn Bolkovac, a Nebraska police officer who was recruited to serve as a U.N. peacekeeper with DynCorp International in post-war Bosnia and Herzegovina in 1999
 Who Is Clark Rockefeller? (2010) – police procedural television film based on the life of Christian Gerhartsreiter, a German con artist who for years impersonated many people, at one point claiming to be part of the Rockefeller family going by the faux name "Clark Rockefeller"
 You Don't Know Jack (2010) – television film based in part on the book Between the Dying and the Dead: Dr. Jack Kevorkian's Life and the Battle To Legalize Euthanasia, focusing on the life and work of physician-assisted suicide advocate Jack Kevorkian
 Yugapurushan (2010) – Indian film about the life and times of Sree Narayana Guru
 The Zero Hour (2010) – based on the events during the 1996 Venezuelan medical strike

2011 
 17 Miracles (2011) – historical adventure film based on the alleged experiences of members of the Willie Handcart Company of Mormon pioneers following their late-season start and subsequent winter journey to Salt Lake City in 1856
 30 Minutes or Less (2011) – action comedy film loosely inspired by the Brian Wells case
 50/50 (2011) – comedy drama film loosely based on the life of screenwriter Will Reiser
 96 Minutes (2011) – Crime thriller film telling the true story of a traumatic car-jacking that results in the destruction of four teenagers' lives
 1911 (Chinese: 辛亥革命) (2011) – Chinese historical drama film based on the 1911 Revolution and Xinhai Revolution
 A Dangerous Method (2011) – historical film set on the eve of World War I, describes the turbulent relationships between Carl Jung, founder of analytical psychology; Sigmund Freud, founder of the discipline of psychoanalysis; and Sabina Spielrein, initially a patient of Jung and later a physician and one of the first female psychoanalysts
 A Funny Man (Danish: Dirch) (2011) – Danish biographical drama film about the Danish actor and comedian Dirch Passer
 A Yell from Heaven (Japanese: 天国からのエール) (2011) – Japanese drama film inspired by the true story of Hikaru Oshiro, an Okinawan altruist who founded the "Ajisai Ongaku Mura", a music village that is open for all to use
 Age of Heroes (2011) – British war film based on the real-life events of the formation of Ian Fleming's 30 Commando unit during World War II
 Amanda Knox: Murder on Trial in Italy (2011) – made-for-television film based on the murder of Meredith Kercher and the trial of the accused of Amanda Knox
 Anonymous (2011) – period drama film depicting a fictionalised version of the life of Edward de Vere, 17th Earl of Oxford an Elizabethan courtier, playwright, poet and patron of the arts, and suggests that he was the actual author of William Shakespeare's play
 Bernie (2011) – black comedy film based on the 1996 murder of 81-year-old millionaire Marjorie Nugent in Carthage, Texas, by her 39-year-old companion Bernie Tiede
 Blackthorn (2011) – Western film based on the life of an aged Butch Cassidy living under the assumed name of James Blackthorn in a secluded village in Bolivia 20 years after his disappearance in 1908
 Cinema Verite (2011) – made-for-television drama film depicting a fictionalized account of the production of An American Family, a 1973 PBS documentary television series that is said to be one of the earliest examples of the reality television genre
 Citizen Gangster (2011) – Canadian biographical drama film based on the true story of Edwin Alonzo Boyd
 Confessions of a Brazilian Call Girl (2011) – Brazilian drama about Bruna Surfistinha.
 The Conquest (2011) – French biographical film about Nicolas Sarkozy 
 The Craigslist Killer (2011) – crime drama made-for-television film inspired by the true story of a man named Philip Markoff who killed one woman and is known to have assaulted at least two others in Massachusetts and Rhode Island
 The Cup (2011) – Australian biographical film about Damien Oliver's victory in the 2002 Melbourne Cup
 Dear Friend Hitler (2011) – Indian drama based on letters written by Mohandes Gandhi to the leader of the Nazi Party and Chancellor of Germany Adolf Hitler
 The Devil's Double (2011) – Belgian-Dutch biographical film based on Latif Yahia, body double for Uday Hussein, the playboy son of Iraqi president Saddam Hussein
 The Dirty Picture (2011) – Indian Hindi-language biographical film based on the life of Silk Smitha, a South Indian actress known for her erotic roles
 Dolphin Tale (2011) – family drama inspired by the true story of a bottlenose dolphin named Winter who was rescued off the Florida coast and taken in by the Clearwater Marine Aquarium, where she is fitted with a prosthetic tail
 The Eagle (2011) – epic historical drama film based on the Ninth Spanish Legion's supposed disappearance in Britain
 Extremely Loud and Incredibly Close (2011) – drama based on the September 11 attacks on the Twin Towers
 The Fields (2011) – suspense thriller film loosely based on the life of screenwriter Harrison Smith
 Free Man (2011) – French war drama which recounts the largely untold story about the role that Algerian and other North African Muslims in Paris played in the French Resistance and as rescuers of Jews during the German occupation (1940–1944)
 Girl Fight (2011) – made-for-television film inspired by a 2008 beating in Florida; a video of some of the beating, released by Polk County Sheriff Grady Judd, was used heavily by the news media and the story caused nationwide public outrage
 Hattie (2011) – British made-for-television film about the life of British comic actress Hattie Jacques, her marriage to John Le Mesurier and her affair with their lodger John Schofield
 Heleno (2011) – Brazilian biographical drama film telling the story of Heleno de Freitas, a legendary football star who played for Botafogo during the 1940s
 Higher Ground (2011) – drama film following the true story of Corinne Walker and her vacillating relationship with Christianity
 The Intouchables (2011) – French buddy comedy drama film based on the true story of a paralyzed man who develops a friendship with his caretaker
 The Iron Lady (2011) – British biographical film based on the life of Margaret Thatcher, the longest-serving Prime Minister of the United Kingdom of the 20th century
 Isoroku (2011) – Japanese war drama film about Imperial Japanese Navy Admiral Isoroku Yamamoto
 J. Edgar (2011) – biographical drama film based on the life of J. Edgar Hoover
 Janie Jones (2011) – drama film based on the story of a young girl who is abandoned by her meth-addicted former-groupie mother, who informs a fading rock star that she is his daughter
 Juan and Eva (Spanish: Juan y Eva) (2011) – Argentine biographical film based on the first meeting of Argentine president Juan Perón and Eva Perón during the 1944 San Juan earthquake
 The Kennedys (2011) – miniseries chronicling the lives of the famous political  Kennedy family, including key triumphs and tragedies it has experienced
 Kill the Irishman (2011) – biographical crime film based on the life of Irish American mobster Danny Greene
 The Lady (2011) – French-British biographical film depicting Aung San Suu Kyi and her late husband Michael Aris
 The Last Ride (2011) – biographical drama film about the last days of country music pioneer and legend Hank Williams
 The Lost Bladesman (2011) – Hong Kong-Chinese historical war biographical action film loosely based on the story of Guan Yu
 Machine Gun Preacher (2011) – biographical  action drama film based on the life of former gang biker turned preacher and defender of Africa orphans Sam Childers
 Magic Beyond Words (2011) – made-for-television biographical film detailing the journey of struggling single mother J. K. Rowling, her bid to become a published author, and her rise to fame that followed the publication of Harry Potter and the Philosopher's Stone
 Margin Call (2011) – independent drama film loosely modeled on "Lehman Brothers" and the financial crisis of 2007–2008
 Moneyball (2011) – biographical sports drama film based on  the Oakland Athletics baseball team's 2002 season
 Monica (2011) – Indian Hindi-language film based on the true story of the murder case of Shivani Bhatnagar, a journalist working for the Indian Express newspaper
 My Week with Marilyn (2011) – British-American drama film depicting the making of the 1957 film The Prince and the Showgirl and focusing on the week during the shooting of the 1957 film when Monroe was escorted around London by Colin Clark after her husband Arthur Miller had returned to the United States
 Nadunissi Naaygal (2011) – Indian Tamil-language Psychological thriller film based on a true story about murderer Veera Bahu
 No One Killed Jessica (2011) – Indian Hindi-language crime thriller film based on real life murder case of Jessica Lall, a model in New Delhi who was working as a celebrity barmaid at a crowded socialite party when she was shot dead in April 1999
 Not a Love Story (2011) – Indian Hindi-language crime thriller film inspired by the murder of Neeraj Grover in 2008 that led to the arrest of Emile Jerome Mathew and Maria Susairaj
 The Pastor's Wife (2011) – made-for-television biographical film based on the true-crime book of the same title about Mary Winkler and her husband
 Perfect Game (Korean: 퍼펙트 게임) (2011) – South Korean biographical film based on the true story of rivals Sun Dong-yeol of the Haitai Tigers and Choi Dong-won of the Lotte Giants, the top pitchers in the Korea Baseball Organization league during the 1980s 
 Puncture (2011) – independent film based on a true story about Mike Weiss, a young Houston lawyer and a drug addict
 Ragini MMS (2011) – Indian found footage horror partly based on the real story of a girl from Delhi named Deepika
 Ramabai Bhimrao Ambedkar (2011) – Indian Marathi-language biographical film based on the life of Ramabai Ambedkar also known as Ramai (mother Rama) wife of Dr. Babasaheb Ambedkar
 Raspoutine (2011) – French-Russian historical drama made-for-television film about the last year of the life of one of the most enigmatic figures of Russian history of the 20th century – Grigori Rasputin
 Red Dog (2011) – Australian comedy drama family film based on a true story about a Kelpie/cattle dog cross who was well known for his travels through Western Australia's Pilbara region
 The Resistance (Chinese: 反抗者) (2011) – Chinese martial arts action film set during World War II inspired by the beginning of the Japanese invasion of China where over 300,000 people in the capital of Nanjing were massacred
 The Rite (2011) – supernatural horror film based on actual events as witnessed and recounted by American then-exorcist-in-training Father Gary Thomas and his experiences of being sent to Rome to be trained and work daily with veteran clergy of the practice
 Sanctum (2011) – action-thriller film inspired by Andrew Wight's near-death experience after leading a diving expedition miles into a system of underwater caves, then having to find a way out after a freak storm collapses the entrance
 The Silence of Joan (2011) – French historical film about Joan of Arc's capture and execution in 1431
 Silenced (Korean: 도가니) (2011) – South Korean crime film drama film based on events that took place at Gwangju Inhwa School for the hearing-impaired, where young deaf students were the victims of repeated sexual assaults by faculty members over a period of five years in the early 2000s
 Silent House (2011) – independent psychological horror film about a young woman who is terrorized in her family vacation home while cleaning the property with her father and uncle, based on an actual incident that occurred in a village in Uruguay in the 1940s
 Snowtown (2011) – Australian biographical crime film drama film based on the Snowtown murders
 Soul Surfer (2011) – biographical drama film about Bethany Hamilton, a 13-year-old surfer who loses her arm in a shark attack, but is determined to get back in the water
 Taken from Me: The Tiffany Rubin Story (2011) – made-for-television film following the true story of the kidnapping and rescue of the son of Tiffany Rubin, who was kidnapped by his father and taken to South Korea
 Tatsumi (2011) – Singaporean Japanese-language animated drama film based on the manga memoir A Drifting Life and five earlier short stories by the Japanese manga artist Yoshihiro Tatsumi
 Texas Killing Fields (2011) – crime film based on true events surrounding the murder of women picked up along I-45 and dumped in an old oil field in League City, Texas
 Thambi Vettothi Sundaram (2011) – Indian Tamil-language docudrama crime film based on a true story, set in Kaliyikkavila, a town on the state border
 Traffic (2011) – Indian Malayalam-language thriller film based on actual events that happened in Chennai
 United (2011) – British made-for-television film based on the true story of Manchester United's "Busty Babes" and the aftermath of the 1958 Munich air disaster
 Violeta Went to Heaven (Spanish: Violeta se fue a los cielos) (2011) – Chilean biographical film about singer and folklorist Violeta Parra
 We Bought a Zoo (2011) – family comedy drama film based on a memoir by Benjamin Mee, owner of Dartmoor Zoological Park near the village of Sparkwell in the county of Devon in England
 White Vengeance (Chinese: 	鴻門宴) (2011) – Chinese historical film loosely based on events in the Chu-Han Contention, an interregnum between the fall of the Qin dynasty and the founding of the Han dynasty in Chinese history.
 William & Kate: The Movie (2011) – made-for-television film about the relationship between Prince William and Catherine "Kate" Middleton (now The Duke and Duchess of Cambridge)
 Winnie Mandela (2011) – biographical drama film about the life of Winnie Madikizela-Mandela 
 The Woman Knight of Mirror Lake (Chinese: 竞雄女侠·秋瑾) (2011) – Chinese-Hong Kong biographical film about Chinese feminist revolutionary Qiu Jin
 Yugapurushan (2011) – Indian Malayalam-language film based on the life of Narayana Guru
 Yuriko, Dasvidaniya (Japanese: 百合子、ダスヴィダーニヤ) (2011) – Japanese historical biographical film following the relationship between author Yuriko Miyamoto and openly lesbian Russian literature translator Yoshiko Yuasa

2012 
 A Smile as Big as the Moon (2012) – made-for-television film based on the 2002 memoir of the same title by teacher Mike Kersjes, outlining his venture to bring out the best from his special education students by taking them to Space Camp
 Abducted: The Carlina White Story (2012) – made-for-television film based on Carlina White
 Act of Valor (2012) – action film based on real US Navy SEALs missions around the world
 An Officer and a Murderer (2012) – made-for-television film about the crimes committed by Russell Williams, a former Colonel in the Royal Canadian Air Force
 Aravaan (2012) – Indian Tamil-language epic historical film which based on the history of Madurai from 1310 to 1910
 Argo (2012) – historical drama thriller film based on the Canadian Caper, dramatization of the rescue of six U.S. diplomats from Tehran in 1979 during the Iran hostage crisis
 As One (Korean: 코리아) (2012) – South Korean sports drama film based on the true story of the first ever post-war Unified Korea sports team which won the women's team gold medal at the 1991 World Table Tennis Championships in Chiba, Japan
 Bert and Dickie (2012) – made-for-television film depicting Dickie Burnell and Bert Bushnell's achievement at the 1948 Summer Olympics
 Big Miracle (2012) – drama film based on Tom Rose's 1989 book Freeing the Whales, which covers Operation Breakthrough, the 1988 international effort to rescue gray whales trapped in ice near Point Barrow, Alaska
 Blue Eyed Butcher (2012) – crime drama made-for-television film based on the 2003 stabbing death of Jeff Wright by the hands of his wife, Susan Wright, but focuses on Kelly Siegler, the case's prosecutor
 Buddha in a Traffic Jam (2012) – Indian political thriller film narrating a tale of inter-meddling of academia with corruption and maoism,  loosely based on the life of Indian author and political activist Arundhati Roy
 Chasing Mavericks (2012) – biographical drama film about the life of American surfer Jay Moriarity 
 Compliance (2012) – thriller film based upon a strip search phone call scam that took place in Mount Washington, Kentucky, in which the caller, posing as a police officer, convinced a restaurant manager to carry out unlawful and intrusive procedures on an employee
 The Consul of Bordeaux (Portuguese: O Cônsul de Bordéus) (2012) – Portuguese biographical historical drama film depicting the life of Aristides de Sousa Mendes
 Dandupalya (2012) – Indian Kannada-language crime film based on the real-life exploits of a notorious gang named 'Dandupalya'
 Emperor (2012) – American-Japanese historical drama film based on the investigation of the role of Emperor Hirohito in World War II
 Falling Flowers (Chinese: 蕭紅) (2012) – Chinese biographical drama film based on the life of writer Xiao Hong
 Fatal Honeymoon (2012) – made-for-television film loosely based on the suspicious death of Tina Watson whilst she was on her honeymoon
 Flight (2012) – action drama film inspired by the true incident of Alaska Airlines Flight 261, in which a Boeing MD-83 suffered vertical control malfunctions and plummeted 31,000 feet on January 31, 2000
 Florbela (2012) – Portuguese biographical film about poet Florbela Espanca
 For Greater Glory (a.k.a. Cristiada) (2012) – Mexican epic historical war drama film based on the Mexican Catholic counter-revolution of the 1920s
 Game Change (2012) – political drama made-for-television film based on John McCain's 2008 presidential election campaign
 Gangs of Wasseypur (2012) – Indian Hindi-language crime action film centered on the coal mafia of Dhanbad, and the underlying power struggles, politics and vengeance between three crime families from 1941 to the mid-1990s
 The Girl (2012) – British made-for-television film based on Donald Spoto's 2009 book Spellbound by Beauty: Alfred Hitchcock and His Leading Ladies, which discusses the English film director Hitchcock and the women who played leading roles in his films (Tippi Hedren)
 Hannah Arendt (2012) – German-French-Luxembourger biographical drama film centering on the life of German-Jewish philosopher and political theorist Hannah Arendt
 Hitchcock (2012) – biographical romantic drama based on the book Alfred Hitchcock and the Making of Psycho about the relationship between director Alfred Hitchcock and his wife Alma Reville during the filming of Psycho
 House on the Hill (2012) – horror film based on the real-life killing spree of serial killers Leonard Lake and Charles Ng
 Hyde Park on Hudson (2012) – British historical comedy-drama film based on the diaries of Margaret Suckley, a close friend of U.S. President Franklin D. Roosevelt
 The Iceman (2012) – biographical crime film about notorious hitman Richard Kuklinski
 The Impossible (2012) – Spanish English-language  disaster drama film based on the experience of María Belón and her family in the 2004 Indian Ocean tsunami
 Ivan Megharoopan (2012) – Indian Malayalam-language biographical film based on the life of Malayalam poet P. Kunhiraman Nair
 Kazhugu (2012) – Indian Tamil-language comedy thriller film revolving around four people, referred to as "Kazhugu," who recover bodies of suicide victims who jump off a cliff
 Kon-Tiki (2012) – historical drama about the 1947 Kon-Tiki expedition
 Last Flight to Abuja (2012) – Nigerian disaster thriller film based on a 2006 Nigerian aviation tragedy
 Lincoln (2012) – biographical historical drama based on the final four months of President Lincoln's life and his efforts in January 1865 to have the Thirteenth Amendment to the United States Constitution passed by the U.S. House of Representatives
 Liz & Dick (2012) – made-for-television biographical film chronicling the relationship of Elizabeth Taylor and Richard Burton
 Naduvula Konjam Pakkatha Kaanom (2012) – Indian Tamil-language black comedy film based on a true story that involves a young man who experiences retrograde amnesia after a cricket incident two days before his wedding
 National Security (Korean: 남영동) (2012) – South Korean prison drama based on the memoir by Kim Geun-tae, a democracy activist who was kidnapped and tortured by national police inspector Lee Geun-an for 22 days in 1985 during the Chun Doo-hwan regime
 No (2012) – Chilean historical drama film based on the unpublished play El Plebiscito, focusing on how advertising tactics came to be widely used in political campaigns for the 1988 plebiscite
 Omar (Arabic: عُمَرْ) (2012) – Arab miniseries based on the life of Omar ibn al-Khattab, ( 583–644), the second Caliph of Islam, and depicts his life from 18 years old until the moments of his death
 Paan Singh Tomar (2012) – Indian Hindi-language biographical film about the eponymous athlete who was a soldier in the Indian Army and won a gold medal at the Indian National Games, but was forced to become a rebel against the system
 People Like Us (2012) – drama film based on the true story of a sister and brother who never knew that they were siblings
 Renoir (2012) – French drama film based on the last years of Pierre-Auguste Renoir at Cagnes-sur-Mer during World War I
 Shadow Dancer (2012) – British-Irish drama film based on a IRA member turned MI5 Informant
 Soegija (2012) – Indonesian epic historical drama about national hero Albertus Soegijapranata
 Sri Ramakrishna Darshanam (2012) – Singaporean-Indian biographical film based on the life and philosophy of 19th century Bengali mystic saint Ramakrishna
 Vinmeengal (2012) – Indian Tamil-language semi-biographical film detailing the extraordinary struggle of a father, who is a magician, to give a normal life to his son who is born with Cerebral Palsy
 The Vow (2012) – romantic drama film based on Kim and Krickitt Carpenter's story of Kim's memory loss following an accident
 Won't Back Down (2012) – drama film loosely based on the events surrounding the use of the parent trigger law in Sunland-Tujunga, Los Angeles in 2010
 Zero Dark Thirty (2012) – war thriller film based on the decade-long manhunt for Al Qaeda leader Osama bin Laden after the 11 September 2001, terrorist attacks in the United States

2013 
 12 Years a Slave (2013) – biographical drama film based on Solomon Northup, a New York State-born free negro who was deceived and kidnapped in Washington, D.C., and sold into slavery (1841–1853)
 42 (2013) – biographical sports film about baseball player Jackie Robinson, the first black athlete to play in Major League Baseball during the modern era
 3096 Days (German: 3096 Tage) (2013) – German biographical drama film based on the story of Natascha Kampusch who was kidnapped at age 10 and held in captivity for 8 years
 A Journey of Samyak Buddha (Hindi: अ जर्नी ऑफ सम्यक बुद्ध) (2013) – Indian Hindi-language film about the journey of Gautam Buddha’s miraculous birth, marriage, and his path towards enlightenment
 American Hustle (2013) – black comedy crime film inspired by the FBI Abscam operation of the late 1970s and early 1980s
 An Adventure in Space and Time (2013) – British biographical made-for-television film dramatizing the events surrounding the creation of Doctor Who in the 1960s, with emphasis on actor William Hartnell as he took on the role of the original incarnation of the show's main character
 The Anna Nicole Story (2013) – biographical drama made-for-television film about late actress and Playboy Playmate, Anna Nicole Smith
 Ask This of Rikyu (Japanese: 利休にたずねよ) (2013) – Japanese biographical film based on Sen no Rikyū, the historical figure with the most profound influence on chanoyu, the Japanese "Way of Tea", particularly the tradition of wabi-cha
 The Attacks of 26/11 (2013) – Indian Hindi-language action thriller film based on the 2008 Mumbai attacks
 Attahasa (2013) – Indian Kannada-language biographical film based on the notorious forest brigand Veerappan
 Behind the Candelabra (2013) – biographical drama film based on the last ten years in the life of pianist Liberace and the relationship that he had with Scott Thorson
 Belle (2013) – British period drama film inspired by the 1779 painting of Dido Elizabeth Belle beside her cousin Lady Elizabeth Murray at Kenwood House
 Betty & Coretta (2013) – made-for-television drama film based on the widows of Martin Luther King and Malcolm X and how they carry on as single mothers after the assassination of their husbands
 Bhaag Milkha Bhaag (2013) – Indian Hindi-language film biographical sports drama film based on life of Indian athlete Milkha Singh
 Big Sur (2013) – adventure drama film based on the time Jack Kerouac spent in Big Sur, California, and his three brief sojourns to his friend Lawrence Ferlinghetti's cabin in Bixby Canyon
 The Bling Ring (2013) – satirical crime film based on the Bling Ring, also known as the Hollywood Hills Burglar Bunch, who broke into Hollywood Hills homes from October 2008 through August 2009
 Blue Caprice (2013) – independent drama film based on the 2002 D.C. sniper attacks
 Bonnie & Clyde (2013) – revisionist miniseries about Great Depression-era outlaws Bonnie Parker and Clyde Barrow
 Bozo (Japanese: ぼっちゃん) (2013) – Japanese drama film based on the Akihabara massacre
 The Butler (2013) – historical drama film based on the real life of Eugene Allen, who worked in the White House for decades
 Camille Claudel 1915 (2013) – French biographical film based on sculptor Camille Claudel
 Captain Phillips (2013) – biographical action thriller film based on the story of the eponymous Captain Richard Phillips, a merchant mariner who was taken hostage by Somali pirates
 CBGB (2013) – biographical drama film about the former New York music venue CBGB
 Celluloid (2013) – Indian Malayalam-language biographical film based on the life story of J. C. Daniel, the father of Malayalam cinema
 The Conjuring (2013) – supernatural horror film based on purportedly real-life reports that inspired The Amityville Horror story
 CrazySexyCool: The TLC Story (2013) – made-for-television biographical film about the R&B and hip hop musical trio TLC
 Dallas Buyers Club (2013) – biographical drama film telling the story of Ron Woodroof, an AIDS patient diagnosed in the mid-1980s when HIV/AIDS treatments were under-researched, while the disease was not understood and highly stigmatized
 Devil's Knot (2013) – biographical crime drama film telling the true story of three murdered children, and the three teenagers known as the West Memphis Three who were convicted of killing them, during the Satanic ritual abuse panic
 The Devil's Violinist (2013) – Italian-German biographical film based on the life story of the 19th-century Italian violinist and composer Niccolò Paganini
 Diana (2013) – British biographical drama film based on the last two years in the life of Diana, Princess of Wales
 Empire State (2013) – crime drama film based on based on a true story of two childhood friends who rob an armored car repository and the NYPD officer who stands in their way 
 Ephraim's Rescue (2013) – Christian historical drama based on the true stories of Mormon pioneers Ephraim Hanks and Thomas Dobson and their experiences in the handcart brigades
 The Fifth Estate (2013) – biographical thriller film about the news-leaking website WikiLeaks
 The Frozen Ground (2013) – thriller film based on the crimes of the real-life Alaskan serial killer Robert Hansen
 Fruitvale Station (2013) – biographical drama film based on the events leading to the death of Oscar Grant, a young man killed in 2009 by BART police officer Johannes Mehserle
 Gagarin: First in Space (Russian: Гагарин. Первый в космосе) (2013) – Russian docudrama biographical film about the first man in space, Yuri Gagarin, and the mission of Vostok 1
 Gimme Shelter (2013) – independent Christian drama based on a true story about a runaway teenage girl who becomes pregnant and is placed in a home for pregnant girls
 The Grandmaster (2013) – martial arts drama film based on the life story of the Wing Chun
 Hope (Korean: 소원) (2013) – South Korean film based on the true story of the infamous Cho Doo-Soon case in 2008, in which an 8-year-old girl, named "Na-young" in the South Korean press, was raped and beaten by a drunk 57-year-old man in a public bathroom
 House of Versace (2013) – Canadian made-for-television biographical drama depicting the real-life events of the Versace family
 The Informant (2013) – French crime thriller film loosely based on a true story of a bar owner in Gibraltar
 The Invisible Woman (2013) – British biographical drama film  about the secret love affair between Charles Dickens and Nelly Ternan, which lasted for thirteen years until his death in 1870
 Jimi: All Is by My Side (2013) – biographical drama film about Jimi Hendrix
 Jobs (2013) – biographical drama film based on the life of Steve Jobs, from 1974 while a student at Reed College to the introduction of the iPod in 2001
 Jodi Arias: Dirty Little Secret (2013) – made-for-television drama about the Murder of Travis Alexander
 Kill Your Darlings (2013) – biographical drama film about the college days of some of the earliest members of the Beat Generation and the killing in Riverside Park
 The Last of Robin Hood (2013) – independent biographical drama film about actor Errol Flynn
 Legend No. 17 (Russian: Легенда №17) (2013) – Russian biographical sports film based on real events and tells of the rise to fame of the Soviet hockey player Valeri Kharlamov and about the first match of the Summit Series USSR — Canada 1972
 Letters to Sofija (Lithuanian: Laiškai Sofijai) (2013) – Lithuanian biographical film about the life of Mikalojus Konstantinas Čiurlionis
 Like the Wind (Italian: Come il vento) (2013) – Italian biographical film telling the story of Armida Miserere, the first woman to direct a high security jail in Italy
 Lone Survivor (2013) – biographical war film based on the eponymous 2007 nonfiction book by Marcus Luttrell 
 The Look of Love (2013) – British biographical film about Paul Raymond
 Louis Cyr (2013) – Canadian biographical drama film about Louis Cyr, the 19th-century strong man still considered to be one of the strongest men to have ever lived
 Lovelace (2013) – biographical drama film centered on porn actress Linda Lovelace, star of Deep Throat, a landmark 1972 film at the forefront of the Golden Age of Porn
 Madras Cafe (2013) – Indian Hindi-language political action thriller film set during the time of Indian intervention in the Sri Lankan civil war
 Mandela: Long Walk to Freedom (2013) – British-South African biographical film based on the 1994 autobiography by Nelson Mandela
 Marina (2013) – biographical film based upon the life of the Italian singer Rocco Granata who moved to Belgium when he was a young boy
 Meghe Dhaka Tara (2013) – Indian Bengali-language film inspired from the life and works of Bengali film director Ritwik Ghatak
 One Chance (2013) – British-American biographical comedy drama film about opera singer and Britain's Got Talent winner Paul Potts
 Orissa (2013) – Indian Malayalam-language romance film based on a Malayali constable, Christhudas, falling in love with an Oriya girl, Suneyi
 Pain & Gain (2013) – action comedy film based on the activities of Sun Gym gang, a group of ex-convicts and bodybuilders convicted of kidnapping, extortion, torture, and murder in Miami in the mid-1990s
 Philomena (2013) –  British drama film based on the true story of Philomena Lee's 50-year search for her adopted son and Sixsmith's efforts to help her find him
 Prosecuting Casey Anthony (2013) – made-for-television crime film depicting the trial of Casey Anthony for the murder of her daughter, Caylee
 The Railway Man (2013) – British war film based on the 1995 autobiography of the same name by Eric Lomax
 Rush (2013) – British-German biographical sports film centred on the Hunt–Lauda rivalry between two Formula One drivers, the British James Hunt and the Austrian Niki Lauda
 Saving Mr. Banks (2013) – biographical drama film centered on the development of the 1964 film Mary Poppins
 Shootout at Wadala (2013) – Indian Hindi-language biographical-gangster-crime film dramatizing a 1982 encounter by Bombay police in which gangster Manya Surve was shot dead
 Snitch (2013) – action thriller film based on the real experiences of Drug Enforcement Agency informant James Settembrino
 Special 26 (2013) – Indian Hindi-language heist film based on the 1987 Opera House heist where a group posing as CBI officers executed an income tax raid on the jeweler in Bombay
 Tracks (2013) – Australian drama film chronicling Robyn Davidson's nine-month journey on camels across the Australian desert
 U Want Me 2 Kill Him? (2013) (stylised as Uwantme2killhim?) – British drama thriller film based on a true story and follows two teenage schoolboys who are drawn into a complicated world of online chatrooms, eventually leading to bizarre consequences
 Waltz for Monica (2013) – Swedish biographical drama film based on the true life and career of singer and actress Monica Zetterlund
 The Wind Rises (Japanese: 風立ちぬ) – Japanese animated historical drama film about Jiro Horikoshi (1903–1982), designer of the Mitsubishi A5M fighter aircraft and its successor, the Mitsubishi A6M Zero, used by the Empire of Japan during World War II
 Wolf Creek 2 (2013) – Australian horror film based upon the real-life murders of backpackers by Ivan Milat in the 1990s and Bradley Murdoch in 2001
 The Wolf of Wall Street (2013) – biographical crime film black comedy film based on the 2007 memoir by Jordan Belfort

2014 
 24 Days (French: 24 jours, la vérité sur l'affaire Ilan Halimi) (2014) – French drama film based on The Affair of the Gang of Barbarians of January 2006.
 50 to 1 (2014) – drama based on the true story of Mine That Bird, an undersized thoroughbred racehorse who won the 2009 Kentucky Derby in one of the biggest upsets in the history of the race
 A Murder Beside Yanhe River (Mandarin: 黃克功案件) (2014) – Chinese historical film based on the murder case of Huang Kegong, who was a general of the Chinese Workers' and Peasants' Red Army
 Aaliyah: The Princess of R&B (2014) – made-for-television biographical film based on the life of R&B music star Aaliyah Dana Haughton, following her rise to fame and tragic death at age 22 when she was killed in a plane crash
 The Admiral: Roaring Currents (Korean: 명량) (2014) – South Korean epic action-war film based on the historical Battle of Myeongnyang
 American Sniper (2014) – biographical war drama film based on the life of Chris Kyle who became the deadliest marksman in U.S. military history with 255 kills from four tours in the Iraq War
 Amour Fou (2014) – Austrian biographical film about the German writer Heinrich von Kleist and his lover Henriette Vogel in the final stages of their lives
 An Honest Liar (2014) – biographical film about the life of former magician, escape artist, and skeptical educator James Randi, in particular the investigations through which Randi publicly exposed psychics, faith healers, and con-artists
 Bad Country (2014) – action film based on the true story of  a veteran detective who infiltrates the most powerful criminal enterprise in the South
 Beloved Sisters (German: Die geliebten Schwestern) (2014) – German biographical film based on the life of the German poet Friedrich Schiller and upon his long relationships with two sisters, Caroline and Charlotte von Lengefeld
 Big Eyes (2014) – biographical drama film based on American artist Margaret Keane
 The Brittany Murphy Story (2014) – made-for-television biographical film based on the life of Brittany Murphy
 Cesar Chavez (2014) – Mexican-American biographical film about the life of American labor leader Cesar Chavez, who cofounded the United Farm Workers
 Chaar Sahibzaade (2014) – Indian Punjabi-language 3D animated historical drama based on the sacrifices of the sons of the 10th Sikh guru Guru Gobind Singh
 Che (Persian: چ) (2014) – Iranian biographical war film depicting 48 hours of the life of Mostafa Chamran, who was then defense minister of Iran
 Desert Dancer (2014) – British biographical drama film based on the true story of Afshin Ghaffarian, a young, self-taught dancer in Iran, who risked his life for his dream to become a dancer despite a nationwide dancing ban
 Diplomacy (French & German: Diplomatie) (2014) – French-German historical drama based on the Liberation of Paris and Hitler's response
 Effie Gray (2014) – British biographical film based on the true story of John Ruskin's marriage to Euphemia Gray and the subsequent annulment of their marriage
 Electric Slide (2014) – biographical crime film film based on Los Angeles-based bank robber Eddie Dodson, who robbed 64 banks in 1983 before he was caught
 Escobar: Paradise Lost (2014) – romantic thriller film about the life of a surfer who falls in love while working with his brother in Colombia and finds out that the girl's uncle is Colombian drug lord Pablo Escobar
 The Face of an Angel (2014) – British psychological thriller film based on the real-life story of the murder of Meredith Kercher in 2007
 Foxcatcher (2014) – biographical sports drama loosely based on the events surrounding multimillionaire John du Pont's 1986 recruitment of Mark Schultz and his older brother David, to help coach U.S. wrestlers for participation in Olympic competition, and the subsequent murder of David Schultz by du Pont in January 1996
 Get on Up (2014) – biographical musical drama film about the life of singer James Brown
 Getúlio (2014) – Brazilian biographical drama about Brazilian president Getúlio Vargas and the events that led to his death
 Gods (Polish: Bogowie) – Polish drama based on the life and career of Polish cardiac surgeon Zbigniew Religa, who performed the first successful heart transplant in Poland in 1987
 Grace of Monaco (2014) – biographical drama film based on former Hollywood star Grace Kelly's crisis of marriage and identity, during a dispute between Monaco's Prince Rainier III and France's Charles de Gaulle in 1962
 Happy Face Killer (2014) – made-for-television film inspired by real-life events of the hunt and capture of serial killer Keith Hunter Jesperson 
 Heaven Is for Real (2014) – Christian drama film based on Pastor Todd Burpo and Lynn Vincent's 2010 book of the same name
 Houdini (2014) – miniseries based on the life of the legendary illusionist and escape artist Harry Houdini, from poverty to worldwide fame
 House of Manson (2014) – biographical film based on the life of Charles Manson
 The Imitation Game (2014) – British historical drama film about cryptanalyst Alan Turing, who decrypted German intelligence messages for the British government during World War II
 The Internet's Own Boy (2014) – biographical film based on the life of Aaron Swartz
 Jamesy Boy (2014) – biographical crime film drama depicting the true story of ex-convict James Burns
 Jersey Boys (2014) –  musical drama film based on the 2004 Tony Award-winning jukebox musical of the same name about the musical group The Four Seasons
 Kajaki (2014) – British war docu-drama film based on the Kajaki Dam incident, involving Mark Wright and a small unit of British soldiers positioned near the Kajaki Dam, in Helmand province, Afghanistan
 Kill the Messenger (2014) – biographical crime film thriller film about reporter Gary Webb who was found dead in his apartment
 The Letters (2014) – biographical drama film based  on the life of Mother Teresa and how Vatican priest Father Celeste van Exem was charged with the task of investigating acts and events following her death
 Lizzie Borden Took an Ax (2014) – made-for-television biographical film based on the true story of Lizzie Borden
 Love & Mercy (2014) – biographical drama about musician and songwriter Brian Wilson of The Beach Boys
 Marie's Story (French: Marie Heurtin) (2014) – French biographical film based on the true story of Marie Heurtin, a girl who was born deaf and blind in late 19th century France
 Marvellous (2014) – British made-for-television drama about the life of Neil Baldwin
 Mary Kom (2014) – Indian Hindi-language biographical sports film based on the life of the eponymous boxer Mary Kom
 Million Dollar Arm (2014) – biographical sports drama film based on the true story of baseball pitchers Rinku Singh and Dinesh Patel who were discovered by sports agent J. B. Bernstein after winning a reality show competition
 The Monuments Men (2014) – American-German war film loosely based on the true story of an Allied group from the Monuments, Fine Arts, and Archives program that is given the task of finding and saving pieces of art and other culturally important items before Nazis destroy or steal them, during World War II
 Mr. Turner (2014) – biographical drama film based around the last twenty-five years of the life and career of painter J. M. W. Turner
 Noble (2014) – biographical film about the true life story of Christina Noble, a children's rights campaigner, charity worker and writer, who founded the Christina Noble Children's Foundation in 1989
 Pawn Sacrifice (2014) – biographical drama film portraying the Cold War-era championship chess match between Bobby Fischer and Boris Spassky
 The Pilgrim (Portuguese: Não Pare na Pista) (2014) – Brazilian-Spanish biographical drama film about the Brazilian lyricist and novelist Paulo Coelho
 Pride (2014) – British LGBT-related historical comedy-drama film based on the true story of a group of lesbian and gay activists who raised money to help families affected by the British miners' strike in 1984, at the outset of what would become the Lesbians and Gays Support the Miners campaign
 Rang Rasiya (2014) – Indian erotic drama film based on the life of the 19th-century Indian painter Raja Ravi Varma
 Return to Zero (2014) – made-for-television drama film based on a true story of writer, Sean Hanish and his pregnant wife, only to have their lives devastated when they learn that the child has died in the womb
 Rosewater –  political drama film based on Maziar Bahari's 2009 imprisonment by Iran, connected to an interview he participated in on The Daily Show that same year
 Selma (2014) – historical drama film based on the 1965 Selma to Montgomery voting rights marches
 Set Fire to the Stars (2014) – Welsh semi-biographical drama film about Dylan Thomas and John Malcolm Brinnin
 The Tenor – Lirico Spinto (2014) – South Korean biographical film chronicling the life of South Korean tenor Bae Jae-chul who performed in numerous European operas, but lost his voice at the peak of his career due to thyroid cancer
 Testament of Youth (2014) – British drama based on Vera Brittain, an independent young woman who abandoned her studies at Somerville College, Oxford, to become a First World War nurse
 The Theory of Everything (2014) – British biographical romantic drama detailing the life of the theoretical physicist Stephen Hawking
 Tim Maia (2014) – Brazilian biographical drama film about the life of Brazilian musician Tim Maia
 Timbuktu (2014) – Mauritanian-French drama based on the brief occupation of Timbuktu, Mali by Ansar Dine, and the 2012 public stoning of an unmarried couple in Aguelhok
 The Unauthorized Saved by the Bell Story (2014) – made-for-television film based on the story of delves into the experiences of six unknown young actors placed into the Hollywood spotlight when they were cast for Saved by the Bell
 Unbroken (2014) – war film about Louis Zamperini who survived in a raft for 47 days after his bomber ditched in the ocean during the Second World War, before being captured by the Japanese and being sent to a series of prisoner of war camps
 United Passions (French: United Passions: La Légende du football) (2014) – French drama about the origins of FIFA
 Wild (2014) – biographical adventure drama film based on Cheryl Strayed and her determination to complete the Pacific Crest Trail by hiking and backpacking after numerous problems left her life in shambles

2015 
 7 Days in Hell (2015) – sports mockumentary film inspired by the Isner–Mahut marathon men's singles match at the 2010 Wimbledon Championships
 10 Days in a Madhouse (2015) – biographical film about undercover journalist Nellie Bly, a reporter for Joseph Pulitzer's New York World who had herself committed to the Women's Lunatic Asylum on Blackwell's Island to write an exposé on abuses in the institution
 The 33 (Spanish: Los 33) (2015) – Chilean biographical disaster-survival drama film based on the real events of the 2010 Copiapó mining disaster
 A Dark Reflection (2015) – British independent investigative thriller film based on actual events surrounding the issue of Aerotoxic Syndrome
 A Song for Jenny (2015) – British  made-for-television film about Julie Nicholson, whose daughter Jenny was murdered in the 7 July 2005 London bombings
 The Adderall Diaries (2015) – Crime drama film based on the memoir by Stephen Elliott depicting his experiences with addiction
 Anton Tchékhov 1890 (2015) – French biographical drama film about Anton Chekhov
 Bajirao Mastani (2015) –  Indian Hindi-language epic historical romance film narrating the story of the Maratha Peshwa Bajirao I (1700–1740 AD) and his second wife, Mastani
 Beautiful & Twisted (2015) – made-for-television crime film drama film based on the Murders of Bernice and Ben Novack, Jr.
 Bessie (2015) – made-for-television drama film about the American blues singer Bessie Smith, and focuses on her transformation as a struggling young singer into "The Empress of the Blues"
 The Big Short (2015) – biographical comedy-drama film based on the 2010 book The Big Short: Inside the Doomsday Machine by Michael Lewis showing how the financial crisis of 2007–2008 was triggered by the United States housing bubble
 Black Mass (2015) – biographical crime film drama film about Irish-American mobster Whitey Bulger
 Blood, Sweat & Tears (Dutch: Bloed, zweet & tranen) (2015) –  Dutch biographical film about the late Dutch singer André Hazes
 Born to Be Blue (2015) – drama film about American jazz musician Chet Baker
 Bridge of Spies (2015) – historical spy thriller based on the story of lawyer James B. Donovan, who is entrusted with negotiating the release of Francis Gary Powers—a U.S. Air Force pilot whose U-2 spy plane was shot down over the Soviet Union in 1960—in exchange for Rudolf Abel, a convicted Soviet KGB spy
 Captive (2015) – crime film drama thriller film based on the true story about Brian Nichols, who escapes from the Fulton County courthouse in Atlanta on March 11, 2005, and holds Ashley Smith as a hostage
 Chiamatemi Francesco (2015) – Italian biographical film about Pope Francis
 Child 44 (2015) – mystery thriller film loosely based on the case of Andrei Chikatilo
 The Classified File (Korean: 극비수사) (2015) – South Korean film based on a real life kidnapping case in Busan in 1978
 Cleveland Abduction (2015) – made-for-television crime film drama film based on the Ariel Castro kidnappings
 Coalition (2015) – made-for-television political drama film about the formation of a coalition government following the 2010 United Kingdom general election
 Colonia (2015) – historical thriller film based on the 1973 Chilean military coup and the real "Colonia Dignidad", a notorious cult in the South of Chile, led by German lay preacher Paul Schäfer
 Concussion (2015) – biographical sports film based on the true story of Dr. Bennet Omalu, a forensic pathologist who fights against the National Football League trying to suppress his research on chronic traumatic encephalopathy (CTE) brain degeneration suffered by professional football players
 Crimea. The Way Home (Russian: Крым. Путь на Родину) (2015) – Russian pseudo-documentary made-for-television film about the Annexation of Crimea by the Russian Federation in 2014
 The Curse of Clara: A Holiday Tale (2015) – Canadian made-for-television film based on Vickie Fagan's experience as a young girl studying ballet at Canada's National Ballet School who is cast in the role of Clara in the school's annual production of The Nutcracker
 Cyberbully (2015) – made-for-television film based entirely on real experiences of cyberbullying
 Danny and the Human Zoo (2015) – British drama made-for-television film inspired by Lenny Henry's life as a teenager in 1970s Dudley
 Danny Collins (2015) – comedy-drama film inspired by the true story of folk singer Steve Tilston 
 The Danish Girl (2015) – biographical romantic drama film inspired by the lives of Danish painters Lili Elbe and Gerda Wegener
 Dolly Parton's Coat of Many Colors (2015) – made-for-television drama film detailing Dolly Parton's upbringing in 1955 as her family struggles to live in Tennessee's Great Smoky Mountains, putting a strain on love and faith
 Eddie the Eagle (2015) – biographical sports film based on the life od Michael Edwards, a British skier who in 1988 became the first competitor to represent Great Britain in Olympic ski jumping since 1928
 The Eichmann Show (2015) – made-for-television drama film based on the true story of how American TV producer Milton Fruchtman and blacklisted TV director Leo Hurwitz came to broadcast the trial of one of World War II's most notorious Nazis, Adolf Eichmann, in 1961
 Eisenstein in Guanajuato (2015) – biographical romantic comedy-drama film based on Soviet film director Sergei Eisenstein
 The End of the Tour (2015) – biographical drama film about writer David Foster Wallace
 Everest (2015) – biographical survival adventure film  based on the real events of the 1996 Mount Everest disaster, and focuses on the survival attempts of two expedition groups, one led by Rob Hall and the other by Scott Fischer
 Experimenter (2015) – biographical drama film based on the 1961 Milgram experiment
 Felix Manalo – Filipino biographical drama film about the life of Felix Ysagun Manalo, the first Executive Minister of the Iglesia ni Cristo
 Freeheld (2015) – drama about police officer Laurel Hester's fight against the Ocean County, New Jersey Board of Chosen Freeholders to allow her pension benefits to be transferred to her domestic partner after being diagnosed with terminal cancer
 Full Out (2015) – made-for-television drama based on the life story of American gymnast Ariana Berlin
 The Gamechangers (2015) – made-for-television biographical drama film based on the story of the controversies caused by Grand Theft Auto, a successful video game series, as various attempts were made to halt the production of the games
 I Am Michael (2015) – biographical drama about Michael Glatze, a gay activist who renounces homosexuality and becomes a Christian pastor
 I Saw The Light (2015) – biographical drama film about Country music legend Hank Williams
 In the Heart of the Sea (2015) –  historical adventure-drama about the sinking of the American whaling ship Essex in 1820, an event that inspired Herman Melville's 1851 novel Moby-Dick
 Ip Man 3 (2015) – Hong Kong biographical martial arts film based on the life of the Wing Chun grandmaster Ip Man
 Jan Hus (2015) – Czech historical made-for-television film based on the life of Jan Hus
 Joy (2015) – biographical comedy-drama film about a struggling single mom of three children, Joy Mangano, who invented the "Miracle Mop" and became the President of Ingenious Designs, LLC
 Kid Kulafu (2015) – Filipino biographical sports drama based on the life of the boxing superstar Manny Pacquiao during his childhood
 Kidnapping Freddy Heineken (2015) – British-Dutch crime film drama based on the 1983 kidnapping of Freddy Heineken
 Killing Jesus (2015) – made-for-television film depicting the life of Jesus of Nazareth through the retelling of the political, social, and historical conflicts during the Roman Empire that ultimately led to his crucifixion
 The Lady in the Van (2015) – British comedy-drama film based on the true story of Alan Bennett and his interactions with Mary Shepherd, an elderly woman who lived in a dilapidated van on his driveway in London for 15 years
 Last Cab To Darwin (2015) – Australian drama  inspired by the true story of Max Bell, a taxi driver who traveled from Broken Hill to Darwin to seek euthanasia after he was diagnosed with a terminal illness
 Legend (2015) – British biographical crime film thriller film about the Kray Twins which deals with their career and the relationship that bound them together, and follows their gruesome career to life imprisonment in 1969
 Life (2015) – biographical drama film based on the friendship of Life photographer Dennis Stock and Hollywood actor James Dean
 The Man Who Knew Infinity (2015) – British biographical drama about the Indian mathematician Srinivasa Ramanujan, based on the 1991 The Man Who Knew Infinity by Robert Kanigel
 Manjhi – The Mountain Man (2015) – Indian Hindi-language biographical film based on the life of Dashrath Manjhi
 Manto (Urdu: منٹو) (2015) – Pakistani biographical drama film based on the life of Pakistani short-story writer Sadat Hassan Manto
 Mary: The Making of a Princess (2015) – Australian made-for-television film about Mary, Crown Princess of Denmark
 McFarland, USA (2015) – sports drama film based on the true story of a 1987 cross country team from a mainly Latino high school in McFarland, California
 The People vs. Fritz Bauer (German: Der Staat gegen Fritz Bauer) (2015) – German biographical drama film based on Fritz Bauer
 Persona Non Grata (Japanese: 	杉原千畝　スギハラチウネ) (2015) – Japanese biographical drama film based on the life of Japanese diplomat Chiune Sugihara who was appointed a vice-consul and later a consul in Lithuania and served there from 1939 to 1940 and who saved lives of some 6,000 Jewish refugees by issuing transit visas to the Japanese Empire
 The Program (2015) – biographical drama about Lance Armstrong
 Queen of the Desert (2015) – epic biographical drama based on the life of British traveller, writer, archaeologist, explorer, cartographer and political officer Gertrude Bell
 The Revenant (2015) – western epic survival drama film based on frontiersman Hugh Glass's experiences in 1823
 Rudramadevi (2015) – Indian  Telugu-language 3D biographical action film based on the life of Rudrama Devi, one of the prominent rulers of the Kakatiya dynasty in the Deccan
 The Sound of a Flower (Korean: 도리화가) (2015) – South Korean period drama film based on the life of Jin Chae-seon, who became Joseon's first female pansori singer in 1867
 Spare Parts (2015) – drama based on the true story of a group of students from Carl Hayden High School, who won the first place over M.I.T. in the 2004 MATE ROV competition
 Spotlight (2015) – biographical crime film drama following The Boston Globe "Spotlight" team, the oldest continuously operating newspaper investigative journalist unit in the United States, and its investigation into cases of widespread and systemic child sex abuse in the Boston area by numerous Roman Catholic priests
 The Stanford Prison Experiment (2015) – docudrama thriller film based on the 1971 Stanford prison experiment, conducted at Stanford University under the supervision of psychology professor Philip Zimbardo, in which students played the role of either a prisoner or prison guard
 Steve Jobs (2015) – biographical drama film covering 14 years (1984–1998) in the life of Apple Inc. co-founder Steve Jobs
 Straight Outta Compton (2015) – biographical musical crime film drama depicting the rise and fall of the gangsta rap group N.W.A and its members Eazy-E, Ice Cube, Dr. Dre, MC Ren, and DJ Yella
 Suffragette (2015) – historical drama film about women's suffrage in the United Kingdom
 The Throne (Korean: 사도) (2015) – South Korean historical drama film based on King Yeongjo and his son Crown Prince Sado
 True Story (2015) – mystery drama film based on Christian Longo, a man on the FBI's most-wanted list accused of murdering his wife and three children in Oregon
 Trumbo (2015) – biographical drama film based on the life of Hollywood screenwriter Dalton Trumbo
 Truth – historical political drama film based on American television news producer Mary Mapes's memoir Truth and Duty: The Press, the President and the Privilege of Power focusing on the Killian documents controversy and the resulting last days of news anchor Dan Rather and producer Mary Mapes at CBS News
 The Unauthorized Beverly Hills, 90210 Story (2015) – made-for-television film based on the 1990s television drama Beverly Hills, 90210
 The Unauthorized Full House Story (2015) – made-for-television drama film based on the behind-the-scenes making of the sitcom Full House
 The Unauthorized Melrose Place Story (2015) – made-for-television drama film based on the behind-the-scenes making of the sitcom Melrose Place 
 Visaranai (2015) – Indian Tamil-language crime drama film dealing with the lives of two men before and after thrown into a kafkaesque scenario in which they get tortured for confession
 The Walk (2015) – 3D biographical drama film based on the story of 24-year-old French high-wire artist Philippe Petit's walk between the Twin Towers of the World Trade Center on August 7, 1974
 Walt Before Mickey (2015) – biographical drama film about the early years of Walt Disney 
 Whitney (2015) – made-for-television biographical film based on American singer Whitney Houston and her turbulent marriage to R&B artist Bobby Brown
 Woman in Gold (2015) – British-American  biographical drama based on the true story of Maria Altmann, an elderly Jewish refugee living in Cheviot Hills, Los Angeles, who, together with her young lawyer, Randy Schoenberg, fought the government of Austria for almost a decade to reclaim Gustav Klimt's iconic painting of her aunt Adele Bloch-Bauer which was taken by the Nazi's prior to World War II
 Woodlawn (2015) – Christian sports drama film based on the true story of Tony Nathan and the Woodlawn High Colonels football team as coaches and teammates struggle to ease racial tensions during the 1973 desegregation of the Birmingham, Alabama school system

2016 
 13 Hours: The Secret Soldiers of Benghazi (2016) – biographical action war film following six members of Annex Security Team who fought to defend the American diplomatic compound in Benghazi, Libya after waves of attacks by militants on September 11, 2012
 A United Kingdom (2016) – biographical romantic drama film based on the true-life romance between Seretse Khama, heir to the throne of Bechuanaland (later Botswana, of which he became president), and his wife Ruth Williams Khama
 Airlift (2016) – Indian Hindi-language action thriller film about a Kuwait-based businessman as he carries out the evacuation of Indians based in Kuwait during the Invasion of Kuwait by Saddam Hussein's Iraq which lead to the beginning of the Gulf War
 Aligarh (2016) – biographical drama film based on the true story of Ramchandra Siras, a professor of Marathi and the head of the Classical Modern Indian Languages Faculty at the famed Aligarh Muslim University, who was suspended on grounds of morality
 All the Way (2016) – made-for-television biographical drama film based on events during the presidency of Lyndon B. Johnson
 Altamira (2016) – Spanish biographical drama film chronicling the groundbreaking discovery of Stone Age cave paintings in the Cave of Altamira in Cantabria, Spain, and the subsequent controversy by leading religious and scientific figures of the day
 Amateur Night (2016) – biographical comedy film based on the early experiences of film writers Joe Syracuse and Lisa Addario in Hollywood
 Anna (2016) – Indian Hindi-language biographical drama film based on the life of  Indian social activist Anna Hazare
 Anthropoid (2016) – British-French war film based on the story of Operation Anthropoid, the World War II assassination of Reinhard Heydrich by exile Czechoslovak soldiers Jozef Gabčík and Jan Kubiš on May 27, 1942
 Azhar (2016) – Indian Hindi-language biographical sports drama film based on the life of Indian cricketer and former national team captain Mohammad Azharuddin
 Barry (2016) – drama film about Barack Obama's life at Columbia University in 1981
 The Birth of a Nation (2016) – American-Canadian historical drama film based on the story of Nat Turner, the enslaved man who led a slave rebellion in Southampton County, Virginia, in 1831
 Birth of the Dragon (2016) – martial arts action film based on the supposedly true story revolving around the young martial artist Bruce Lee, who challenged kung fu master Wong Jack-man in 1965 in San Francisco
 Bleed for This (2016) – biographical sports film based on the life of former world champion boxer Vinny Paz
 Brain on Fire (2016) – American-Irish biographical drama film telling the true story of a New York Post writer who begins to suffer a mysterious illness and would have been committed to the psychiatric ward and probably died of encephalitis, if it were not for the efforts and skills of Syrian-American neurologist Souhel Najjar
 Cézanne and I (French: Cézanne et moi) (2016) – French biographical drama film based on the friendship between 19th century novelist Émile Zola and painter Paul Cézanne
 Chocolat (2016) – French drama film loosely based on the real life of Rafael Padilla,  a clown who performed in a Paris circus around the 1900s and son of a slave from Cuba, a Spanish colony at the time
 Christine (2016) – British-American biographical drama film about Christine Chubbuck, a news reporter who struggles with depression, along with professional and personal frustrations as she tries to advance her career
 The Chronicles of Melanie (Latvian: Melānijas hronika) (2016) – Latvian biographical drama film based on the real life of Melānija Vanaga
 Chuck (2016) – biographical sports drama film based on the life of heavyweight boxer Chuck Wepner and his 1975 title fight with the heavyweight champion, Muhammad Ali, which inspired Sylvester Stallone's character and screenplay for the 1976 film Rocky
 Confirmation – made-for-television political thriller film about Clarence Thomas' Supreme Court nomination hearings, and the controversy that unfolded when Anita Hill alleged she was sexually harassed by Thomas
 The Conjuring 2 (2016) – supernatural horror film based on purportedly real-life reports that inspired The Amityville Horror story
 The Dancer (French: La Danseuse) (2016) – French biographical historical drama film about Loie Fuller
 Dangal (2016) – Indian Hindi-language biographical sports drama film based on Mahavir Singh Phogat, a pehlwani amateur wrestler who trains his daughters Geeta Phogat and Babita Kumari to become India's first world-class female wrestlers 
 Deepwater Horizon (2016) – biographical disaster film  based on the Deepwater Horizon explosion and oil spill in the Gulf of Mexico
 Denial (2016) – biographical film dramatizing the Irving v Penguin Books Ltd case, in which Lipstadt, a Holocaust scholar, was sued by Holocaust denier David Irving for libel
 Donald Trump's The Art of the Deal: The Movie (2016) – satirical parody film loosely based on the 1987 autobiographical book Trump: The Art of the Deal
 Dongju: The Portrait of a Poet (Korean: 동주) (2016) – South Korean black-and-white biographical period drama film based on the life of poet Yun Dong-ju and his eventual imprisonment by the Japanese government for being involved in the Korean independence movement
 Egon Schiele: Death and the Maiden (German: Egon Schiele: Death and the Maiden) (2016) – Austrian-Luxembourgish biographical film based on the life of Egon Schiele
 Ek Thi Marium (Urdu: اک تھی مریم) (2016) – Pakistani made-for-television biographical drama film based on the life of Pakistani female fighter pilot  Marium Mukhtiar
 El Inca (2016) – Venezuelan drama about professional boxer Edwin Valero
 Elvis & Nixon (2016) – comedy-drama film based on the 21 December 1970 meeting of Elvis Presley and President Richard Nixon at the White House
 Fanny's Journey (French: Le Voyage de Fanny) (2016) – French-Belgian children's war drama film inspired by an autobiographical book by Fanny Ben Ami, a girl escaping the Holocaust
 Florence Foster Jenkins (2016) – biographical film about Florence Foster Jenkins, a New York heiress known for her poor singing and generosity
 The Founder (2016) – biographical drama film based on a true story about Ray Kroc and the start of the McDonald's franchise
 Free State of Jones (2016) – historical war film inspired by the life of Newton Knight and his armed revolt against the Confederacy in Jones County, Mississippi, throughout the American Civil War
 Genius (2016) – British-American biographical drama film based on the 1978 National Book Award-winner Max Perkins: Editor of Genius by A. Scott Berg
 Gold (2016) – crime film drama film based on the true story of the 1993 Bre-X mining scandal, when a massive gold deposit was supposedly discovered in the jungles of Indonesia
 Greater (2016) – biographical sports film about American football player Brandon Burlsworth, a walk-on college player who became an All-American, dying in a car crash 11 days after being drafted high in the 3rd round to the National Football League
 Hacksaw Ridge (2016) – American-Australian biographical war film focusing on the World War II experiences of Desmond Doss, an American pacifist combat medic who, as a Seventh-day Adventist Christian, refused to carry or use a weapon or firearm of any kind
 Hands of Stone (2016) – biographical sports film about the career of Panamanian former professional boxer Roberto Durán
 Hidden Figures (2016) – biographical drama film about African American female mathematicians who worked at the National Aeronautics and Space Administration (NASA) during the Space Race
 I'm Gilda (Spanish: Gilda, no me arrepiento de este amor) (2016) – Argentine biographical drama film about the life of tropical singer and songwriter Gilda
 I'm Not Ashamed (2016) – biographical drama film based on the journals of Rachel Scott, the first victim of the 1999 Columbine High School massacre in Columbine, Colorado
 The Infiltrator (2016) – biographical crime thriller film based on the eponymous autobiography by Robert Mazur, a U.S. Customs special agent, who in the 1980s helped bust Pablo Escobar's money-laundering organization by going undercover as a corrupt businessman
 Jackie (2016) – biographical drama following Jacqueline "Jackie" Kennedy in the days when she was First Lady in the White House and her life immediately following the assassination of her husband, United States President John F. Kennedy, in 1963
 The Last Descent (2016) – biographical survival drama film based on the 2009 rescue attempt of John Edward Jones in Nutty Putty Cave, west of Utah Lake
 LBJ (2016) – political drama about the beginning of the presidency of United States President Lyndon B. Johnson following the assassination of United States President John F. Kennedy
 The Legend of Ben Hall (2016) – Australian bushranger film, based on the exploits of bushranger Ben Hall
 Lion (2016) – Australian-British biographical drama based on the true story of how Saroo Brierley, 25 years after being separated from his family in India, sets out to find them
 The Lost City of Z (2016) –  biographical adventure drama film based on the story of Percy Fawcett, who was sent to Brazil and made several attempts to find a supposed ancient lost city in the Amazon
 Loving (2016) – biographical romantic drama film which tells the story of Richard and Mildred Loving, the plaintiffs in the 1967 U.S. Supreme Court (the Warren Court) decision Loving v. Virginia, which invalidated state laws prohibiting interracial marriage
 Mah e Mir (Urdu: ماہ میر) (2016) – Pakistani biographical film based on the life of the famous poet Mir Taqi Mir
 Masterminds (2016) – crime comedy film based on the October 1997 Loomis Fargo robbery in North Carolina
 Maudie (2016) – Irish-Canadian biographical drama film about the life of folk artist Maud Lewis, who painted in Nova Scotia
 Miracles from Heaven (2016) – Christian drama film the true story of Annabel Beam who had a near-death experience and was later cured of an incurable disease
 M.S. Dhoni: The Untold Story (2016) – Indian Hindi-language biographical sports drama film based on the life of former Test, ODI and T20I captain of the Indian national cricket team, Mahendra Singh Dhoni
 Neerja (2016) – Indian Hindi-language biographical thriller film based on the attempted hijacking of Pan Am Flight 73 in Karachi, Pakistan by Libyan-backed Abu Nidal Organization on 5 September 1986
 Nelly (2016) – biographical-drama film based on Nelly Arcan, an award-winning Canadian author and former sex worker who committed suicide in 2009
 Neruda (2016) – Spanish-language biographical drama film depicting the dramatic events of the suppression of Communists in Chile in 1948 and how the poet Pablo Neruda had to go on the run, eventually escaping on horseback over the Andes
 The Night Stalker (2016) – biographical drama about the serial killer Richard Ramirez
 Nina (2016) – biographical film about American musician and civil rights activist Nina Simone
 The Odyssey (French: L'Odyssée) (2016) – French-Belgian biographical adventure film based on Jacques-Yves Cousteau, a French ocean-going adventurer, biologist, and filmmaker
 Patriots Day (2016) – action thriller film about the Boston Marathon bombings in 2013 and the subsequent terrorist manhunt
 Pelé: Birth of a Legend (2016) – biographical film about the early life of Brazilian footballer Pelé and his journey with Brazil to win the 1958 FIFA World Cup
 The People v. O. J. Simpson: American Crime Story (2016) – true crime miniseries revolving around the O. J. Simpson murder case 
 The Promise (2016) – epic historical drama film set in the final years of the Ottoman Empire
 Queen of Katwe (2016) – biographical sports drama film based on the life of Phiona Mutesi, a girl living in Katwe, a slum of Kampala, the capital of Uganda who learns to play chess and becomes a Woman Candidate Master after her victories at World Chess Olympiads
 Race (2016) – biographical sports drama film about African American athlete Jesse Owens, who won a record-breaking four gold medals at the 1936 Berlin Olympic Games
 Ramabai (2016) – Indian Kannada-language biographical film based on the life of Ramabai Ambedkar, the first wife of Indian social reformer and politician B. R. Ambedkar
 Red Dog: True Blue (2016) – Australian family comedy film detailing the early days of the Red Dog, the Pilbara Wanderer
 Riphagen (2016) – Dutch drama film about Dries Riphagen, a Dutch criminal who collaborated with Nazi Germany
 Rudy Habibie (2016) – Indonesian biographical historical drama film about B. J. Habibie
 Rustom (2016) – Indian Hindi-language crime film drama film based on the K. M. Nanavati v. State of Maharashtra court case
 Sarbjit (2016) – Indian biographical drama film based on Sarabjit Singh, an Indian man who was sentenced to death by the Supreme Court of Pakistan in 1991 and who consequently spent 22 years in prison for alleged terrorism and spying
 Snowden (2016) – biographical thriller film about Edward Snowden, a Central Intelligence Agency (CIA) subcontractor and whistleblower who copied and leaked highly classified information from the National Security Agency (NSA) beginning in 2013
 Southside with You (2016) – biographical romantic drama film focusing on the  Barack Obama and Michelle Robinson's first date in 1989
 Sully (2016) – biographical drama about Chesley "Sully" Sullenberger's January 2009 emergency landing of US Airways Flight 1549 on the Hudson River, in which all 155 passengers and crew survived—most suffering only minor injuries—and the subsequent publicity and investigation
 Surviving Compton: Dre, Suge & Michel'le (2016) – made-for-television biographical drama based on the true story of R&B singer, Michel'le
 USS Indianapolis: Men of Courage (2016) – war disaster film based on the true story of the loss of the ship of the same name in the closing stages of the Second World War
 Veerappan (2016) – Indian Hindi-language biographical crime film based on the real-life Indian bandit Veerappan and the events leading to Operation Cocoon, a mission to capture and kill him
 War Dogs (2016) – biographical black comedy crime film abotu two arms dealers, Efraim Diveroli and David Packouz, who receive a U.S. Army contract to supply ammunitions for the Afghan National Army worth approximately $300 million
 Xuanzang (Mandarin: 大唐玄奘) (2016) – Chinese historical adventure film based on Xuanzang's seventeen-year overland journey to India during the Tang dynasty in the seventh century

2017 
 6 Below: Miracle on the Mountain (2017) – survival drama film based on the true story of former professional hockey player Eric LeMarque, who finds himself stranded in the High Sierra during a fierce snowstorm and must use his wit and willpower to survive
 6 Days (2017) – action thriller film based on the 1980 Iranian Embassy siege in London
 9/11 (2017) – drama depicting five elevator passengers trapped during the September 11 attacks
 Above the Law (French: Tueurs) – French-Belgian crime thriller film based on the true story of a career criminal, who commits a bank heist with his crew, and is set up by corrupt police, for the murder of a judge investigating the 30 year old unsolved case of the mass murders of Brabant who had been duped into being at the getaway scene, and for killing bystanders who witness the murder
 Aftermath (2017) – thriller film based on events and persons surrounding the 2002 Überlingen mid-air collision of a passenger airline with a cargo jet, although the names, places, nationalities, and incidents were changed
 The Age of Pioneers (2017) – Russian historical drama film about cosmonaut Alexei Leonov, the first human to perform a spacewalk
 All Eyez on Me (2017) – biographical drama about hip-hop artist Tupac Shakur
 All Saints (2017) – Christian drama about a small-town Tennessee preacher, Michael Spurlock, who attempts to save his struggling church as well as a group of refugees from Karen State, Myanmar, in Southeast Asia
 All the Money in the World (2017) – crime film thriller film depicting the events surrounding the actual 1973 kidnapping of John Paul Getty III in Italy and the refusal of his grandfather, The multi-billionaire oil tycoon, J Paul Getty, to cooperate the extortion demands of the Italian organized crime group known as ‘Ndrangheta
 American Made (2017) – biographical crime film about Barry Seal, a drug-smuggling pilot who became a government informant
 Anarchist from Colony (Korean: Park Yeol) (2017) – South Korean biographical period drama film about the life of independence activist Park Yeol
 Baba Sathya Sai (2017) – Indian biographical film based on the life of Indian spiritual leader Sathya Sai Baba
 Battle of the Sexes (2017) – biographical sports drama of the 1973 exhibition tennis match between Billie Jean King and Bobby Riggs
 The Big Sick (2017) – romantic comedy film loosely based on the real-life romance between Kumail Nanjiani and Emily Gordon, it follows an interethnic couple who must deal with cultural differences after Emily becomes ill
 Bitter Harvest (2017) – romantic-action drama film based in Soviet Ukraine in the early 1930s
 The Black Prince (2017) – historical drama film depicting the story of Duleep Singh, the last Maharajah of the Sikh Empire and the Punjab area, and his relationship with Queen Victoria
 Bobbi Kristina (2017) – biographical drama film based on the life of Bobbi Kristina Brown
 Bomb City (2017) – crime film based on the death of Brian Deneke, the homicide that revealed the cultural clash between the local jocks and the punk community in Amarillo, Texas, and the result from the subsequent court case sparked debate over injustice in the American judicial system
 Borg vs McEnroe (2017) – sports drama film focusing on the famous rivalry between tennis players Björn Borg and John McEnroe at the 1980 Wimbledon Championships
 Breathe (2017) – biographical drama film that tells the story about Robin Cavendish, who became paralysed from the neck down by polio at age 28
 Britney Ever After (2017) – biographical drama film based on the life of Britney Spears
 The Case for Christ (2017) – Christian drama based on the true story that inspired the 1998 book of the same name by Lee Strobel
 Chappaquiddick (2017) – drama starring Jason Clarke as Massachusetts Senator Ted Kennedy, detailing the 1969 Chappaquiddick incident in which Kennedy drove his car into the Poucha Pond, killing Kopechne, as well as the Kennedy family's response
 Churchill (2017) – British historical war-drama film about Winston Churchill in June 1944 – especially in the hours leading up to D-Day
 Cocaine Godmother (2017) – biographical crime drama film based on the life of Griselda Blanco
 Crown Heights (2017) – biographical crime film drama film depicting the true story of Colin Warner who was wrongfully convicted of murder, and how his best friend Carl King devoted his life to proving Colin's innocence
 The Current War (2017) – historical drama film inspired by the 19th century competition between Thomas Edison and George Westinghouse over which electric power delivery system would be used in the United States (often referred to as the "war of the currents")
 Darkest Hour (2017) – war drama set in May 1940, it stars Gary Oldman as Winston Churchill and is an account of his early days as Prime Minister during World War II and the May 1940 War Cabinet Crisis, while Nazi Germany's Wehrmacht swept across Western Europe and threatened to defeat the United Kingdom. The German advance leads to friction at the highest levels of government between those who would make a peace treaty with Adolf Hitler, and Churchill, who refused
 Dating Game Killer (2017) – made-for-television biographical film about serial killer Rodney Alcala
 The Death of Stalin (2017) – British satirical black-comedy film that depicts the power struggle following the death of Soviet leader Joseph Stalin in 1953
 Detroit (2017) – period crime drama film of the Algiers Motel incident during the 1967 Detroit riot
 The Disaster Artist (2017) – comedy-drama film based on Tommy Wiseau's 2003 The Room
 Django (2017) – French biographical drama film about the life of Django Reinhardt
 Dunkirk (2017) – about the Dunkirk evacuation in France during World War II
 England Is Mine (2017) – British biographical drama film, based on the early years of singer Morrissey, before he formed The Smiths in 1982 with Johnny Marr
 Final Portrait (2017) – British-American drama about the friendship between Swiss sculptor, painter, draftsman and printmaker Alberto Giacometti and American writer James Lord
 First They Killed My Father (2017) – story on how they forced 7-year-old Ung, to be trained as a child soldier while my siblings were sent to labor camps
 Flint (2017) – made-for-television drama based on the Flint water crisis
 Gautamiputra Satakarni ( Satakarni, son of Gautami) (2017) – Indian Telugu-language epic historical action film based on the life of 2nd century AD Satavahana ruler Gautamiputra Satakarni
 The Glass Castle (2017) – biographical drama based Jeannette Walls' 2005 best-selling memoir of the same name, depicting Wall's childhood, where her family lived in poverty and sometimes as squatters
 Going Vertical (Russian: Dvizhenie vverkh) (2017) – Russian sports drama film about the controversial victory of the Soviet national basketball team over the 1972 U.S. Olympic team, ending their 63-game winning streak, at the Munich Summer Olympic's men's basketball tournament
 Goodbye Christopher Robin (2017) – British biographical drama film about A. A. Milne and his son Christopher Robin Milne, the inspiration for the Winnie-the-Pooh books
 The Greatest Showman (2017) – musical biographical drama film, inspired by the story of P. T. Barnum's creation of Barnum's American Museum and the lives of its star attractions
 I Am Elizabeth Smart (2017) – made-for-television biographical crime film based on the Kidnapping of Elizabeth Smart
 I, Tonya (2017) – biographical film with elements of black comedy and crime drama, it follows the life of figure skater Tonya Harding and her connection to the 1994 attack on her rival Nancy Kerrigan
 The Immortal Life of Henrietta Lacks (2017) – made-for-television biographical telling the story of Henrietta Lacks, who was diagnosed with cervical cancer in the 1950s, and whose cancer cells (later known as HeLa) would change the course of cancer treatment
 The Institute (2017) – thriller film about a young girl's stay at The Rosewood Institute
 Jungle (2017) – circa 1981 true story of Yossi Ghinsberg who survived being lost in the Bolivian Jungle 
 Loving Pablo (2017) – Spanish biographical crime drama film based on Virginia Vallejo's memoir Loving Pablo, Hating Escobar
 The Man Who Invented Christmas (2017) – biographical drama based on the book of the same name by Les Standiford, following Charles Dickens (Stevens) as he conceives and writes A Christmas Carol
 The Man with the Iron Heart (2017) – English-language French-Belgian biographical war-drama-thriller film based on French writer Laurent Binet's novel HHhH, and focuses on Operation Anthropoid, the assassination of Nazi leader Reinhard Heydrich in Prague during World War II
 Mark Felt: The Man Who Brought Down the White House (2017) – biographical political thriller film depicting how Mark Felt became the anonymous source nicknamed "Deep Throat" for reporters Bob Woodward and Carl Bernstein and helped them in the investigation which led them to the Watergate scandal, which resulted in the resignation of President Richard Nixon
 Marshall (2017) – biographical legal drama starring Chadwick Boseman as Thurgood Marshall, the first African-American Supreme Court Justice, and focuses on one of the first cases of his career, the State of Connecticut v. Joseph Spell
 Megan Leavey (2017) – biographical drama based on the true events about a young female marine named Megan Leavey and a combat dog named Rex
 Menendez: Blood Brothers (2017) – made-for-television biographical film based on the lives of Lyle and Erik Menendez, two brothers who were convicted of murdering their parents in 1989
 The Mercy (2017) – British biographical drama film based on the true story of the disastrous attempt by the amateur sailor Donald Crowhurst to complete the Sunday Times Golden Globe Race in 1968 and his subsequent attempts to cover up his failure
 Michael Jackson: Searching for Neverland (2017) – made-for-television biographical film based on the 2014 book, Remember the Time: Protecting Michael Jackson in His Final Days, written by Jackson's personal bodyguards Bill Whitfield and Javon Beard. The film dramatizes Jackson in the final years of his life
 Molly's Game (2017) – biographical crime drama film based on the memoir of the same name by Molly Bloom
 The Most Hated Woman in America (2017) – In 1995, Madalyn Murray O'Hair is kidnapped along with her son Garth and granddaughter Robin by three men
 My Friend Dahmer (2017) – biographical psychological drama film about American serial killer Jeffrey Dahmer
 The New Edition Story (2017) – biographical about the R&B group New Edition, from their rise to fame as a boy band from the Orchard Park Projects of Roxbury, Massachusetts, to becoming a successful adult act
 Only the Brave (2017) – The story of the Granite Mountain Hotshots and the 2013 Yarnell Hill Fire
 Papillon (2017) – biographical drama film telling the story of French convict Henri Charriere, nicknamed Papillon ("butterfly"), who was imprisoned in 1933 in the notorious Devil's Island penal colony and escaped in 1941 with the help of another convict, counterfeiter Louis Dega
 The Pirates of Somalia (2017) – drama about Jay Bahadur and his reporting on piracy in Somalia
 The Polka King (2017) – biographical comedy film about real-life Polish-American polka band leader Jan Lewan, who was imprisoned in 2004 for running a Ponzi scheme
 Poorna: Courage Has No Limit (2017) – Indian Hindi language biographical adventure film with Aditi Inamdar as Malavath Poorna, the youngest girl to climb the Mount Everest.
 The Post (2017) – historical political thriller film starring Meryl Streep as Katharine Graham, the first female publisher of a major American newspaper, and Tom Hanks as Ben Bradlee, the executive editor of The Washington Post. Set in 1971, The Post depicts the true story of attempts by journalists at The Washington Post to publish the Pentagon Papers, classified documents regarding the 20-year involvement of the United States government in the Vietnam War
 Professor Marston and the Wonder Women (2017) – biographical drama film about William Moulton Marston, the creator of Wonder Woman
 Rebel in the Rye (2017) – biographical drama about the life of writer J. D. Salinger during and after World War II
 Roxanne Roxanne (2017) – drama revolving around the life of rapper Roxanne Shante
 Salyut-7 (2017) – Russian historical drama film about the 1985 Soyuz T-13 mission to the Salyut 7 space station
 Same Kind of Different as Me (2017) – Ron Hall, a successful art dealer, comes to the home of Julio, a man he previously sold a painting to. Julio allows Ron to write a book about his life and a life-changing event he experienced
 Sand Castle (2017) – film centering on Matt Ocre, a young soldier in the United States Army, who is tasked with restoring water to a village in Iraq, based on the true events and the experience of the film's writer Roessner during the Iraq War
 Stronger (2017) – biographical drama film based on the memoir of Boston Marathon bombing survivor Jeff Bauman
 Thank You for Your Service (2017) – biographical war drama based on the 2013 non-fiction book of the same name by David Finkel. Finkel, a Washington Post reporter, wrote about veterans of the 2nd Battalion, 16th Infantry Regiment returning to the vicinity of Fort Riley, Kansas, following a 15-month deployment in Iraq in 2007
 Three Christs (2017) – drama based on Milton Rokeach's nonfiction book The Three Christs of Ypsilanti of three patients whose paranoid schizophrenic delusions cause each of them to believe they are Jesus Christ
 The Upside (2017) – comedy-drama film, a remake of the 2011 French film The Intouchables, which was itself inspired by the life of Philippe Pozzo di Borgo
 Viceroy's House (2017) – British-Indian historical drama film telling the true story of the final months of British rule in India. Viceroy's House in Delhi was the home of the British rulers of India. After 300 years, that rule was coming to an end. For 6 months in 1947, Lord Mountbatten, great-grandson of Queen Victoria, assumed the post of the last Viceroy, charged with handing India back to its people
 Victoria & Abdul (2017) – British biographical comedy-drama film based on the book of the same name by Shrabani Basu, about the real-life relationship between Queen Victoria of the United Kingdom and her Muslim servant Abdul Karim
 War Machine (2017) – satirical war film depicting a fictionalized version of events surrounding Gen. Stanley A. McChrystal in Afghanistan
 Women Walks Ahead (2017) – biographical drama film about the story of Caroline Weldon, a portrait painter who travels from New York to Dakota to paint a portrait of Sitting Bull in 1890
 The Wizard of Lies (2017) – television biopic film starring Robert De Niro as businessman and fraudster Bernie Madoff, Michelle Pfeiffer as Ruth Madoff and Alessandro Nivola as their older son Mark Madoff
 The Zookeeper's Wife (2017) – war drama telling the true story of how Jan and Antonina Zabiński rescued hundreds of Jews from the Germans by hiding them in their Warsaw Zoo during World War II

2018 
 3 Days in Quiberon (German: 3 Tage in Quiberon) (2018) – German drama film about actress Romy Schneider
 7 Days in Entebbe (2018) – action thriller film that tells about the story of Operation Entebbe, a 1976 counter-terrorist hostage-rescue operation
 12 Strong (2018) – action war drama based on the story of U.S. 5th Special Forces Group who were sent to Afghanistan immediately after the September 11 attacks
 The 15:17 to Paris (2018) – biographical drama following Spencer Stone, Anthony Sadler, and Alek Skarlatos through life leading up to and including their stopping of the 2015 Thalys train attack
 22 July (2018) – crime film drama film about the 2011 Norway attacks and their aftermath
 27 Guns (2018) – action adventure biographical film about Yoweri Museveni and his military colleagues during the Ugandan Bush War
 A Futile and Stupid Gesture (2018) – biographical comedy-drama film about comedy writer Douglas Kenny, during the rise and fall of National Lampoon
 A Private War (2018) – biographical war drama film about Marie Colvin, an American journalist for The Sunday Times, visiting the most dangerous countries and documenting their civil wars
 Adrift (2018) – survival drama film based on a true story set during the events of Hurricane Raymond in 1983
 American Animals (2018) – Heist film based on the story of an actual heist which took place at Transylvania University in Lexington, Kentucky in 2004.
 The Angel (2018) – Egyptian-Israeli spy thriller film based on Ashraf Marwan, a high-ranking Egyptian official who became a double agent for both countries and helped achieve peace between the two
 At Eternity's Gate (2018) – French-British biographical drama film about the final years of painter Vincent van Gogh's life
 Beautiful Boy (2018) – biographical drama film based on a father-son relationship increasingly strained by the latter's drug addiction
 Believe Me: The Abduction of Lisa McVey (2018) – Canadian-American crime film drama film recounting the true story of Lisa McVey who was abducted and raped for 26 hours by serial killer Bobby Joe Long in 1984
 Billionaire Boys Club (2018) – biographical crime film drama film based on the real life Billionaire Boys Club from Southern California during the 1980s, a group of rich teenagers who get involved in a Ponzi scheme and eventual murder
 BlacKkKlansman (2018) –biographical crime film set in the early-1970s Colorado Springs, the plot follows Ron Stallworth, the first African-American detective in the city's police department as he sets out to infiltrate and expose the local Ku Klux Klan chapter
 Blaze (2018) – biographical drama film based on the life of country musician Blaze Foley
 Bohemian Rhapsody (2018) – biographical musical drama depicting the story of the life of Freddie Mercury, the lead singer of the British rock band Queen, from the formation of the band in 1970 up to their 1985 Live Aid performance at the original Wembley Stadium
 Boy Erased (2018) – biographical drama based on the story f the son of Baptist parents who is forced to take part in a gay conversion therapy program
 Burden (2018) – drama based on the story of Mike Burden, an orphan raised within the Ku Klux Klan who attempts to break away when the woman he falls in love with urges him to leave for a better life together
 Brian Banks (2018) – biographical drama film about Brian Banks, a high school football linebacker who was falsely accused of rape and upon his release attempted to fulfil his dream of making the National Football League
 Can You Ever Forgive Me? (2018) – biographical film based on the story of Lee Israel and her attempts to revitalize her failing writing career by forging letters from deceased authors and playwrights
 Charlie Says (2018) – biographical drama film about infamous killer, Charles Manson
 City of Lies (2018) – crime thriller film about the investigations by the Los Angeles Police Department of the murders of rappers Tupac Shakur and The Notorious B.I.G.
 Colette (2018) – biographical drama film based upon the life of French novelist Colette
 Come Sunday (2018) – drama based on Carlton Pearson's excommunication 
 Diary of My Mind (French: Journal de ma tête) (2018) – Swiss made-for-television true crime film  about a school teacher who must confront the effects of having been made an unwitting accomplice to a murder committed by her student Benjamin, when he confesses to the murder and his motivations in a homework assignment he turned in to her just before committing the crime, based on a true crime story from European history
 Don't Worry, He Won't Get Far on Foot (2018) – comedy-drama film following a recently paralyzed alcoholic who finds a passion for drawing off-color newspaper cartoons
 Dovlatov (Russian: Довлатов) (2018) – Russian biographical film about writer Sergei Dovlatov
 The Drug King (Korean: 마약왕) (2018) – South Korean crime film drama film depicting the true life story of Lee Doo-sam, a drug smuggler building his empire in Busan's crime underworld in the 1970s
 The Favourite (2018) – period black comedy film set in early 18th-century England, the film's plot examines the relationship between two cousins, Sarah, Duchess of Marlborough and Abigail Masham, who are vying to be Court favourites of Queen Anne 
 First Man (2018) – biographical drama film exploring the years leading up to the Apollo 11 mission to the Moon in 1969
 First Name: Mathieu (French: Prénom: Mathieu) (2018) – Swiss made-for-television true crime film based on the real life case of serial killer Michel Peiry
 The Front Runner (2018) – political drama film chronicling the rise of American Senator Gary Hart, a candidate to be the 1988 Democratic presidential nominee, and his subsequent fall from grace when media reports suggested he was having an extramarital affair
 Girl in the Bunker (2018) – made-for-television film depicting the kidnapping of 14-year-old Elizabeth Shoaf
 Gold (2018) – Indian Hindi-language period-sports drama film based on the journey of India's first national hockey team to the 1948 Summer Olympics
 Gosnell: The Trial of America's Biggest Serial Killer (2018) – drama based on the real life events about Kermit Gosnell, a physician and abortion provider who was convicted of first degree murder in the deaths of three infants born alive, involuntary manslaughter in the death of a patient undergoing an abortion procedure, 21 felony counts of illegal late-term abortion, and 211 counts of violating a 24-hour informed consent law
 Gotti (2018) – biographical crime film film about New York City mobster John Gotti
 Goyo: The Boy General (Fillipino: Goyo: Ang Batang Heneral) (2018) – Filipino historical epic film about Gregorio del Pilar, who died during the historic Battle of Tirad Pass in the Philippine–American War
 Green Book (2018) – biographical comedy-drama film inspired by the true story of a tour of the Deep South by African American classical and jazz pianist Don Shirley and Italian American bouncer Frank "Tony Lip" Vallelonga, who served as Shirley's driver and bodyguard
 The Happy Prince (2018) – biographical drama film about Oscar Wilde
 Harry & Meghan: A Royal Romance (2018) – made-for-television film about the meeting and courtship of Prince Harry and Meghan Markle
 Hotel Mumbai (2018) – Australian-American-Indian action thriller film inspired by the 2009 documentary Surviving Mumbai about the 2008 Mumbai attacks at the Taj Mahal Palace Hotel in India
 Hurricane (2018) – Polish-British biographical war drama depicting the experiences of a group of Polish pilots of No. 303 Squadron RAF ( 303) in the Battle of Britain in the Second World War
 I Can Only Imagine (2018) – Christian biographical drama based on the story behind the group MercyMe's song of the same name, the best-selling Christian single of all time
 Indivisible (2018) – Christian drama based on the true story of Darren Turner. It follows an Army chaplain as he struggles to balance his faith and the Iraq War
 In Like Flynn (2018) – Australian biographical film about the early life of actor Errol Flynn
 Killed by My Debt (2018) – British made-for-television drama based on the life of Jerome Rogers who died by suicide aged twenty having accrued debts of over £1,000 stemming from two unpaid £65 traffic fines
 Kursk (2018) – Belgian-French-Luxembourgish disaster drama-thriller film depicting the true story of the 2000 Kursk submarine disaster
 Le Mans 1955 (2018) –  computer-animated short film inspired by the 1955 Le Mans disaster
 Leto ( Summer) (2018) – Russian musical film depicting the Leningrad underground rock scene of the early 1980s, drawing loosely from the lives of the Soviet rock musicians Viktor Tsoi and Mike Naumenko
 Lizzie (2018) – biographical thriller film based on the true story of Lizzie Borden, who was accused and acquitted of the axe murders of her father and stepmother in Fall River, Massachusetts, in 1892
 Mahanati ( The great actress) (2018) – Indian Telugu-language biographical drama based on the life of Indian actress Savitri
 Mary Queen of Scots (2018) – historical drama film about Mary, Queen of Scots and her cousin Queen Elizabeth I and chronicling the 1569 conflict between their two countries
 May the Lord Be with Us (Czech: Bůh s námi - od defenestrace k Bílé hoře) (2018) – Czech made-for-television historical drama film set during Bohemian Revolt that triggered Thirty Years' War
 Metanol (2018) – Czech made-for-television drama focusing on the 2012 Czech Republic methanol poisonings
 The Miracle Season (2018) – sports drama film based on the true story of the Iowa City West High School volleyball team after the sudden death of the team's heart and leader, Caroline Found, in 2011
 The Mule (2018) – crime drama film which recounts the story of Leo Sharp, a World War II veteran who became a drug courier for the Sinaloa Cartel in his 80s
 My Dinner with Hervé (2018) – made-for-television drama based on the later days of actor Hervé Villechaize
 No One Would Tell (2018) – made-for-television film based on the true story of Jamie Fuller, a 16-year-old high school student who murdered his 14-year-old girlfriend
 The Old Man & the Gun (2018) – biographical crime filmabout Forrest Tucker, a career criminal and escape artist
 On My Skin (Italian: Sulla mia pelle) (2018) – Italian drama based on the real story of the last days of Stefano Cucchi, a 31-year-old building surveyor who died in 2009 during preventive custody, victim of police brutality
 On the Basis of Sex (2018) – biographical legal drama film based on the life and early cases of Supreme Court Justice Ruth Bader Ginsburg, who served as an Associate Justice of the United States Supreme Court from 1993 to her death in 2020, and became the second woman to serve on the Supreme Court
 Operation Finale (2018) – historical drama film that follows the efforts of Israeli Mossad officers to capture former SS officer Adolf Eichmann in 1960
 Outlaw King (2018) – British-American historical action drama film about Robert the Bruce, the 14th-century Scottish King who launched a guerrilla war against the larger English army. The film largely takes place during the 3-year historical period from 1304, when Bruce decides to rebel against the rule of Edward I over Scotland, thus becoming an "outlaw", up to the 1307 Battle of Loudoun Hill
 Parmanu: The Story of Pokhran (2018) – Indian Hindi-language historical action drama film based on India's second secret nuclear test series in Pokhran, Rajasthan in 1998
 Paterno (2018) – made-for-television drama about former Penn State football coach Joe Paterno, and his career leading up to his dismissal following the university's child sex abuse scandal in 2011
 Raazi (2018) – Indian Hindi-language spy thriller film about an Indian spy married to a Pakistani man during the Indo-Pakistani War of 1971
 Red Joan (2018) – British spy drama film inspired by the life of Melita Norwood who worked at the British Non-Ferrous Metals Research Association as a secretary and supplied the Soviet Union with nuclear secrets
 Riot (2018) – Australian made-for-television drama about the LGBTI rights movement in the 1970s and the beginnings of the Sydney Gay and Lesbian Mardi Gras
 Sanju (2018) – Indian Hindi-language biogrophical comedy drama film depicting the life of Bollywood actor Sanjay Dutt, his addiction with drugs, arrest for his association with the 1993 Bombay bombings, relationship with his father, comeback in the industry, the eventual drop of charges from the Bombay bombings, and release after completing his jail term
 Sirius (2018) – Swiss made-for-television true crime film based on the Order of the Solar Temple fires at Salvan in 1994
 Skin (2018) – biographical drama following the life of Bryon Widner, a former member of a Neo-Nazism-influenced skinhead group
 Soorma  (2018) – Indian Hindi-language biographical sports drama film based on the life of and return of hockey player Sandeep Singh
 Stan and Ollie (2018) – biographical comedy-drama based on the later years of the lives of the comedy double act Laurel and Hardy
 Tag (2018) – comedy film based on the true story that was published in The Wall Street Journal about a group of grown men who spend one month a year playing the game of tag
 Traffic Ramasamy (2018) – Indian Telugu-language biographical film based on the real-life story of the veteran social activist K. R. Ramaswamy who received the nickname of Traffic Ramaswamy for his activism in controlling traffic related issues in Tamil Nadu
 Unbroken: Path to Redemption (2018) – Christian drama that acts as a sequel to the 2014 film Unbroken, although none of the original cast or crew returns except the producer Matthew Baer, and actors Vincenzo Amato and Maddalena Ischiale. The film chronicles Louis Zamperini following his return from World War II, his personal struggles to adjust back to civilian life and his eventual conversion to evangelical Christianity after attending one of Billy Graham's church revivals
 Vice (2018) – biographical comedy-drama film following Dick Cheney on his path to become the most powerful Vice President in American history
 Vita and Virginia (2018) – British biographical romantic drama based on the love affair between Vita Sackville-West and Virginia Woolf
 Welcome to Marwen (2018) – drama inspired by the true story of Mark Hogancamp, a man struggling with PTSD who, after being physically assaulted, creates a fictional village to ease his trauma
 White Boy Rick (2018) – biographical crime drama film based on a true story, the film stars Richie Merritt as Richard Wershe Jr., who in the 1980s became the youngest FBI informant ever at the age of 14
 The White Crow (2018) – British-French biographical drama film chronicling the life and dance career of ballet dancer Rudolf Nureyev
 Winchester (2018) – supernatural horror film based on the life of Sarah Winchester and follows her as she is haunted by spirits inside her San Jose mansion in 1906

2019 
 4x4 (2019) – Argentine-Spanish thriller crime film film based on Ciro, a criminal who breaks into a 4x4 pickup truck owned by an obstetrician medic Enrique Ferrari to steal a car stereo
 15 Minutes of War (French: L'intervention) (2019) – French-Belgian war film based on real events known at the Prise d'otages de Loyada
 72 Hours: Martyr Who Never Died (2019) – Indian Hindi-language biographical film based on the life and times of rifleman Jaswant Singh Rawat, who fought against the enriching Chinese army during the 1962 Sino-Indian War
 1917 (2019) – American-British war film based in part on an account told to Mendes by his paternal grandfather, Alfred Mendes, and chronicles the story of two young British soldiers during World War 1 who are given a mission to deliver a message. This warns of an ambush during a skirmish, soon after the German retreat to the Hindenburg Line during Operation Alberich in 1917
 A Beautiful Day in the Neighborhood (2019) –  biographical drama based on Lloyd Vogel, a troubled journalist for Esquire who is assigned to profile television icon Fred Rogers
 A Call to Spy (2019) – historical drama film inspired by the true stories of three women who worked as spies in World War II
 A Girl from Mogadishu (2019) – Irish-Belgian semi-biographical film based on the testimony of Ifrah Ahmed, who having escaped war-torn Somalia, emerged as one of the world's foremost international activists against gender-based violence
 A Hidden Life (2019) – epic historical drama film based on the life of Franz Jägerstätter, an Austrian farmer and devout Catholic who refused to fight for the Nazis in World War II
 A Regular Woman (German: Nur eine Frau) (2019) – German biographical film based on the life of Hatun "Aynur" Sürücü who was killed by her brother in an honor killing
 Abducted: The Mary Stauffer Story (2019) – based on the true story of the kidnapping of Mary and Elizabeth Stauffer at the hands of Ming Sen Shiue
 Above Suspicion (2019) – crime thriller film based upon Joe Sharkey's non-fiction book of the same name revolving around the murder of Susan Smith
 The Accidental Prime Minister (2019) – Indian Hindi-language biographical drama film about Manmohan Singh, the economist and politician who served as the 13th Prime Minister of India from 2004 to 2014 under the United Progressive Alliance
 The Act (2019) – true crime drama miniseries based on the real life of Gypsy Rose Blanchard and the murder of her mother, Dee Dee Blanchard, who was accused of abusing her daughter by fabricating illness and disabilities as a direct consequence of Munchausen syndrome by proxy. 
 Adults in the Room (Greek: Enílikoi stin aíthous) (2019) – French-Greek film based on  the 2015 Greek bailout
 The Aeronauts (2019) – biographical adventure film follows the balloon expedition of James Glaisher, whose life goal is to travel into the sky to predict the weather and breaks the world record for altitude after reaching a height of 36,000 feet
 Amundsen (2019) – Norwegian biographical film that details the life of Norwegian explorer Roald Amundsen
 An Officer and a Spy (French: J'Accuse) (2019) – French historical drama film about the Dreyfus affair
 Apache: The Life of Carlos Tevez (Spanish: Apache: La vida de Carlos Tevez) (2019) – Argentine miniseries about Carlos Tevez's rise as a football player amid the conditions in Argentina's Ejército de Los Andes, better known as Fuerte Apache
 Article 15 (2019) – Indian Hindi-language crime drama film inspired by multiple real-life cases involving crimes driven by caste-based discrimination, including the 2014 Badaun gang rape allegations and 2016 Una flogging incident.
 Bad Education (2019) – crime drama film based on  the true story of the largest public school embezzlement in American history
 The Balkan Line (Russian: Балканский рубеж) (2019) – Russian-Serbian propaganda film depicting a secret operation to capture Slatina Airport in Kosovo after the bombing of Yugoslavia, led by Yunus-bek Yevkurov
 Batla House (2019) – Indian Hindi-language action thriller film inspired by the Batla House encounter case that took place on 19 September 2008
 The Battle of Jangsari (Korean:  장사리) (2019) – Korean action-war film telling the true story of a group of 772 student soldiers who staged a small diversionary operation at Jangsari beach in Yeongdeok to draw away North Korean attention from Incheon.
 The Best of Enemies (2019) – drama which focuses on the rivalry between civil rights activist Ann Atwater and Ku Klux Klan leader C. P. Ellis
 Blinded by the Light (2019) – British comedy-drama film inspired by the life of journalist Sarfraz Manzoor and his love of the works of Bruce Springsteen
 Bolden (2019) – drama film based on the life of cornetist Buddy Bolden
 Bombshell (2019) – biographical drama film based upon the accounts of the women at Fox News who set out to expose CEO Roger Ailes for sexual harassment
 The Boy Who Harnessed the Wind (2019) – British drama film based on the memoir The Boy Who Harnessed the Wind by William Kamkwamba and Bryan Mealer
 Breakthrough (2019) – Christian drama film about St. Louis author Joyce Smith's son John who slipped through an icy lake in January 2015 and was underwater for 15 minutes before resuscitative efforts were started. Although being rescued, he is in a coma, and his family must rely on their faith to get through the ordeal
 Brecht (2019) – German made-for-television  biographical film dealing with the life and work of the German playwright Bertolt Brecht
 Brexit: The Uncivil War (2019) – British made-for-television drama film based on the lead-up to the 2016 referendum through the activities of the strategists behind the Vote Leave campaign, that prompted the United Kingdom to exit the European Union, known as Brexit
 Brittany Runs a Marathon (2019) – Comedy film based on the true story of an overweight woman in New York City who sets out to lose weight and train for the city's annual marathon
 Brotherhood (2019) – Canadian drama based on the true story of a group of youth at a summer camp on Balsam Lake in the Kawartha Lakes, who had to fight for survival when an unforeseen thunderstorm overwhelmed their canoe trip
 Capsized: Blood in the Water (2019) – biographical natural horror-survival film, based on the 1982 true story of a small boat crew aboard a private yacht who are stranded in shark infested waters, following a storm that overturns their vessel
 The Cave (Thai: นางนอน) (2019) – Thai action-drama film about the 2018 Tham Luang cave rescue in Chiang Rai Province, Thailand
 Cherkasy (2019) – Ukrainian drama film about the defense of the eponymous naval Natya-class minesweeper, blocked by Russian troops in Donuzlav Bay, Crimea during the 2014 capture of Southern Naval Base
 Chernobyl (2019) – historical drama miniseries revolving around the Chernobyl nuclear disaster of April 1986 and the cleanup efforts that followed
 Claws of the Red Dragon (2019) – Canadian made-for-television drama film depicting a fictionalization of the political and diplomatic issues surrounding the 2018 arrest of Huawei CFO Meng Wanzhou by the Royal Canadian Mounted Police
 Close (2019) – action thriller based on Jacquie Davis, one of the world's leading female bodyguards, whose clients have included J. K. Rowling, Nicole Kidman, and members of the British royal family
 The College Admissions Scandal (2019) – made-for-television film is based on the 2019 college admissions bribery scandal
 Danger Close: The Battle of Long Tan (2019) – Australian war film about the Battle of Long Tan during the Vietnam War
 Daniel (Danish: Ser du månen, Daniel) (2019) – Danish biographical film about Daniel Rye who was held hostage by ISIS for 13 months.
 Dark Waters (2019) – legal thriller film based on Robert Bilott's real-life legal battle against DuPont over the release of a toxic chemical into Parkersburg, West Virginia's water supply, affecting 70,000 townspeople and livestock
 Dauntless: The Battle of Midway (2019) – Action film based on a true story of United States Navy aviators at the Battle of Midway
 Death of a Cheerleader (2019) – made-for-television film about the Murder of Kirsten Costas
 The Devil Has a Name (2019) – dark comedy based on the decades-long legal battle between Fred Starrh and Aera Energy over allowing 600 million barrels of oil waste, from unlined wastewater ponds, to contaminate California's Central Valley groundwater where more than half the nuts, fruits and vegetables in the U.S. are grown
 The Dirt (2019) – biographical comedy-drama film about Heavy metal band Mötley Crüe
 Dolemite Is My Name (2019) – biographical comedy film about filmmaker Rudy Ray Moore, best known for portraying the character of Dolemite in both his stand-up routine and a series of blaxploitation films, starting with Dolemite in 1975
 Effigy: Poison and the City (German: Effigie – Das Gift und die Stadt) (2019) – German-American historical thriller film about German 19th century female serial killer Gesche Gottfried
 Elcano & Magellan: The First Voyage Around the World (Spanish: Elcano y Magallanes: La primera vuelta al mundo) (2019) – Spanish computer-animated adventure film telling the story of 1519 circumnavigation led by Portuguese explorer Ferdinand Magellan and Spanish navigator Juan Sebastián Elcano
 Elisa & Marcela (Spanish: Elisa y Marcela) (2019) – Spanish biographical romantic drama film based on the story of Elisa Sánchez Loriga and Marcela Gracia Ibeas, two women who posed as a heterosexual couple in order to marry in 1901 at the Church of Saint George in A Coruña becoming the first same-sex matrimony recorded in Spain
 En el corredor de la muerte (2019) – Docudrama miniseries depicting the judicial case that began in 1994 when club owner Casimir Sucharski and dancers Sharon Anderson and Marie Rodgers were found shot to death in Sucharski's house in Miramar, Florida
 Escaping the NXIVM Cult: A Mother's Fight to Save Her Daughter (2019) – made-for-television biographical film based on Catherine and India Oxenberg and their story of escaping the NXIVM cult 
 Extremely Wicked, Shockingly Evil and Vile (2019) – biographical crime thriller film about the life of serial killer Ted Bundy
 The Farewell (2019) – A Chinese family discovers their grandmother has only a short while left to live and decide to keep her in the dark. Based on Director Lulu Wong's real life. 
 Fighting with My Family (2019) – British-American biographical sports comedy-drama film based on the WWE career of English professional wrestler Paige
 Fisherman's Friend's (2019) – British biographical comedy-drama based on a true story about Port Issac's Fisherman's Friends, a group of Cornish fishermen from Port Issac who were signed by Universal Records and achieved a top 10 hit with their debut album of traditional sea shanties
 Ford v Ferrari (2019) – sport drama film about automotive designer Carroll Shelby and race car driver Ken Miles, who lead a team of American engineers and designers from Ford to build a race car that can beat legendary Ferrari
 Fosse/Verdon (2019) – biographical miniseries which tells the story of director–choreographer Bob Fosse and actress and dancer Gwen Verdon's troubled personal and professional relationship
 The Gangster, the Cop, the Devil (2019) – Korean action thriller film based on a true story from 2005 three characters: a serial killer, the gangster who was almost a victim of the killer and the cop who wants to arrest the killer
 Goalie (2019) – Canadian biographical sports film about the hockey goaltender Terry Sawchuk
 The Golden Glove (German: Der Goldene Handschuh) (2019) – German-French horror drama film depicting the story of German serial killer Fritz Honka who murdered four women between 1970 and 1975 and hid the parts of dead bodies in his apartment
 Gumnaami (2019) – Indian Bengali-language biographical mystery film based on the mystery of Netaji's death, based on the Mukherjee Commission hearings and the book Conundrum written by Anuj Dhar and Chandrachur Ghose
 Harriet (2019) – biographical drama film based on the life of abolitionist Harriet Tubman, who escaped slavery and led hundreds of enslaved people to freedom on the Underground Railroad
 The Haunting of Sharon Tate (2019) – horror thriller film based on the 1969 Tate murders mixed with fictional elements
 Hell on the Border (2019) – Western film based on the true story of Bass Reeves, the first African-American deputy U.S. Marshal west of the Mississippi River.
 The Highwaymen (2019) – historical crime film drama film about two former Texas Rangers who attempt to track down and apprehend notorious criminals Bonnie and Clyde in the 1930s
 Hustlers (2019) – crime film comedy-drama film which follows a crew of New York City strippers who begin to steal money by drugging stock traders and CEOs who visit their club, then running up their credit cards
 I Am the Night (2019) – drama miniseries inspired by the memoir One Day She'll Darken: The Mysterious Beginnings of Fauna Hodel, written by Fauna Hodel, documenting her unusual beginnings and the connection to her grandfather, George Hodel, a prime suspect in the infamous Black Dahlia murder mystery
 I Am Somebody's Child: The Regina Louise Story (2019) – made-for-television film based on the life of Regina Louise
 I Am Woman (2019) – Australian biographical film about Australian feminist icon Helen Reddy
 Ip Man 4: The Finale (Mandarin: 葉問4：完結篇) (2019) – Chinese martial arts film, the fourth and final film in the Ip Man film series based on the life of the Wing Chun grandmaster of the same name 
 The Irishman (2019) – epic crime drama film about Frank Sheeran, a truck driver who becomes a hitman involved with mobster Russell Bufalino and his crime family, including his time working for the powerful Teamster Jimmy Hoffa
 John the Apostle, the Most Beloved (Spanish: Juan Apóstol, el más amado) (2019) – Mexican made-for-television film based on the life of John the Apostle
 Judy (2019) – biographical drama film about American singer and actress Judy Garland
 Just Mercy (2019) – biographical legal drama film based on Bryan Stevenson's 2014 eponymous memoir, in which he explored his journey to making his life's work the defense of African American prisoners
 Kardec (2019) – Brailian drama about Léon Denizard Rivail, a French educator who, when studying the phenomenon of “Spinning tables”, discovers that there is the possibility of communicating with the spirits
 Kesari (2019) – Indian Hindi-language action-war film following the events leading to the Battle of Saragarhi, a battle between 21 soldiers of the 36th Sikhs of the British Indian Army and 10,000 Afridi and Orakzai Pashtun tribesmen in 1897
 The Kid (2019) – semi-biographical western action film centering around Rio Cutler who forms and unlikely alliance with local sheriff Pat Garret and infamous outlaw Billy the Kid in a mission to rescue his sister Sara from Grant Cutler, the boy's thuggish uncle and gang leader
 The Kill Team (2019) – war film, a fictionalised adaption of the events explored by an earlier documentary of the same name
 The Killing of Kenneth Chamberlain (2019) – biographical drama based on the police shooting of Chamberlain in 2011
 The King (2019) – epic war film based on King Henry V of England
 Kingdom (Japanese: キングダム) (2019) – Japanese action adventure film that portrays the life of Li Xin, a general of Qin, from his childhood as an orphan through his military career during the Warring States period of ancient China
 Lakshmi's NTR (2019) – Indian Telugu-language biographical drama film based on the life of former film actor and chief minister of undivided Andhra Pradesh, N. T. Rama Rao
 Lancaster Skies (2019) – British war film focusing on the British bomber campaign in World War II
 The Last Vermeer (2019) – drama film based on the story of Han van Meegeren, an art maker who swindled millions of dollars from the Nazis, alongside Dutch Resistance fighter Joseph Piller
 The Laundromat (2019) – biographical comedy-drama film based on the Panama Papers scandal
 The Last Full Measure (2019) – war drama that tells the true story of Vietnam War hero William H. Pitsenbarger, a U.S. Air Force Pararescuemen (also known as a PJ) who personally saved over sixty men and flew on almost 300 rescue missions during the war to aide downed soldiers and pilots
 The Lighthouse (2019) – American-Canadian horror psychological thriller survival film about two lighthouse keepers start to lose their sanity when a storm strands them on the remote island on which they are stationed (based, in part, on the Smalls Lighthouse incident, which occurred in 1801)
 Lillian (2019) – Austrian drama film inspired by the true story of Lillian Alling, an Eastern European immigrant to the United States who, in the 1920s, attempted a return by foot to her homeland. Starting in New York, she walked across the United States and Canada trying to cross the Bering Strait
 The Loudest Voice (2019) – drama biographical miniseries depicting Roger Ailes as he creates and guides the rise of Fox News
 Love You to Death (2019) – made-for-television crime film drama depicting the events of the Murder of Dee Dee Blanchard
 Manikarnika: The Queen of Jhansi (2019) – Indian Hindi-language period drama film based on the life of Rani Lakshmi Bai of Jhansi
 Maria's Paradise (Finnish: Marian paratiisi) (2019) – Finnish drama based on the life of Maria Åkerblom 
 Mercy Black (2019) – horror film loosely based on the story was Mary Bell, who had murdered two toddlers when she was a child.  Bell had been granted a new identity after being released from jail, but tabloid reporters discovered her new identity
 Midway (2019) – war film based on the Attack on Pearl Harbour and the subsequent Battle of Midway during World War II
 Military Wives (2019) – British comedy-drama film inspired by the true story of the Military Wives Choir
 Mission Mangal (2019) – Indian Hindi-language drama film loosely based on the life of scientists at the Indian Space Research Organisation who contributed to India's first interplanetary expedition Mars Orbiter Mission
 Moffie (2019) – South African-British  biographical war romantic drama film revolving around two gay characters Nicholas van der Swart and Dylan Stassen who attempt to come to terms with their homosexuality
 Mosul (2019) – Arabic-language war action film based on the 2016 Battle of Mosul, which saw Iraqi Government forces and coalition allies defeat ISIS who had controlled the city since June 2014
 Mr Jones (2019) – biographical thriller film that tells the story of Welsh journalist Gareth Jones, who in 1933 travels to the Soviet Union and Ukraine and uncovers the Soviet famine of 1932–33
 Mrs Lowry & Son (2019) – biographical drama set in Pendlebury Greater Manchester, chronicling the life of the renowned artist L. S. Lowry
 The Murder of Nicole Brown Simpson (2019) – crime film horror film based on the murder of Nicole Brown Simpson, presenting an alternative theory of who her killer could have been, serial killer Glen Edward Rogers, as opposed to the main suspect, her ex-husband, O. J. Simpson
 NTR: Kathanayakudu ( NTR: The Hero) (2019) – Indian Telugu-language biographical film, based on the real life and acting career of N. T. Rama Rao
 NTR: Mahanayakudu ( NTR: The Great Leader) (2019) – Indian Telugu-language biographical film, based on the real life and political career of N. T. Rama Rao
 Official Secrets (2019) – British-American docudrama based on the life of whistleblower Katherine Gun who leaked a memo detailing that the United States had eavesdropped on diplomats from countries tasked with passing a second United Nations resolution on the invasion of Iraq
 Oh Mercy! (French: Roubaix, une lumière) (2019) – French crime film drama film inspired by the 2008 TV documentary Roubaix, commissariat central, directed by Mosco Boucault.
 Once Upon a Time in Hollywood (2019) – comedy-drama film featuring multiple storylines in a modern fairy tale tribute to the final moments of Hollywood's golden age, highlighting Sharon Tate
 Once Upon a Time in London (2019) – British crime film about the notorious gangsters Billy Hill and Jack Comer
 Our Friend (2019) – biographical drama film based on Matthew Teague's 2015 Esquire article "The Friend: Love Is Not a Big Enough Word"
 Panipat (2019) – Indian Hindi-language epic war film depicting the events that took place during the Third Battle of Panipat
 Patsy & Loretta (2019) – made-for-television biographical film based on the friendship between country singers Patsy Cline and Loretta Lynn
 The Professor and the Madman (2019) – biographical drama film about the professor, James Murray, who in 1879 began compiling the Oxford English Dictionary and led the overseeing committee, and W. C. Minor, a doctor who submitted over 10,000 entries while he was undergoing treatment at Broadmoor Criminal Lunatic Asylum
 Radioactive (2019) – British biographical film based on the life of Marie Curie
 The Red Sea Diving Resort (2019) – spy thriller film which is loosely based on the events of Operation Moses and Operation Joshua in 1984–1985, in which the Mossad covertly evacuated Jewish Ethiopian refugees to Israel
 The Report (2019) – drama following staffer Daniel Jones and the Senate Intelligence Committee as they investigate the CIA's use of torture following the September 11 attacks
 Richard Jewell (2019) – biographical drama film depicting the Centennial Olympic Park bombing and its aftermath during the 1996 Summer Olympics in Atlanta, Georgia, in which security guard Richard Jewell found a bomb and alerted authorities to evacuate, only to later be wrongly accused of having placed the device himself
 Ride Like a Girl (2019) – Australian biographical sports drama based on the true story of Michelle Payne, the first female jockey to win the Melbourne Cup in 2015
 Robert the Bruce (2019) – historical drama war film concerning the renowned king of the same name
 Rocketman (2019) – biographical musical drama based on the life of musician Elton John
 Run This Town (2019) – drama based on the final year of Rob Ford's tenure as the mayor of Toronto
 Samurai Marathon (Japanese: サムライマラソン) (2019) – Japanese-British historical action adventure film inspired by the origin story of the Ansei Toashi 30-km footrace held annually in Annaka City
 Seberg (2019) – Political thriller film about Jean Seberg, who in the late 1960s was targeted by the FBI because of her support of the civil rights movement and romantic involvement with Hakim Jamal, among others
 The Shiny Shrimps (French: Les Crevettes pailletées) (2019) – French sports comedy film about an Olympic swimming champion who makes a homophobic comment in a television interview, and is disciplined by the national swim team with the responsibility of coaching a gay water polo team who aspire to compete in the Gay Games, loosely based on Cédric Le Gallo's real-life water polo team
 The Sholay Girl (2019) – Indian Hindi-language biographical period drama film based on India's first stuntwoman, Reshma Pathan
 Shooting Clerks (2019) – British-American biographical comedy-drama film detailing how Kevin Smith bankrolled his $27,000 first film with maxed-out credit cards and garnered career-making critical attention at the Sundance Film Festival when Clerks debuted there in 1994
 Sister Aimee (2019) – biographical film dramatizing the of disappearance of Aimee Semple McPherson
 Soldier Boy (Russian: Солдатик) (2019) – Russian drama film based on the real-life story of the youngest soldier in World War II, Sergei Aleshkov,  who was only 6 years old 
 Song Without a Name (Spanish: Canción sin nombre) (2019) – Peruvian drama film based on true event of an indigenous Andean woman whose newborn baby is whisked away moments after its birth in a downtown Lima clinic - and never returned
 The Souvenir (2019) – drama film depicting a semi-autobiographical account of Joanna Hogg's experiences at film school
 The Spy (2019) – French espionage-thriller drama miniseries based on the life of Israel's top Mossad spy Eli Cohen
 Super 30 (2019) – Indian Hindi-language biographical drama narrating the life of mathematician Anand Kumar and his educational program of the same name
 Sye Raa Narasimha Reddy (2019) – Indian Telugu-language historical action film inspired by the life of Indian independence activist Uyyalawada Narasimha Reddy from the Rayalaseema region of Andhra Pradesh
 Tashkent Files (2019) – Indian Hindi-language conpiracy thriller film about the death of former Indian prime minister Lal Bahadur Shastri
 Thackeray (2019) – Indian biographical film following the life of Balasaheb Thackeray, the founder of the Indian political party Shiv Sena
 Togo (2019) – drama about "two key figures in the 1925 serum run to Nome, also known as the Great Race of Mercy, in which dog-sled teams relayed to transport diphtheria antitoxin serum through harsh conditions over nearly 700 miles to save the Alaskan town of Nome from an epidemic sickness
 Tolkien (2019) – biographical drama film about the early life of English professor J. J. R. Tolkien, author of The Hobbit and The Lord of the Rings, as well as notable academic works
 The Traitor (2019) – Italian biographical crime film drama film about the life of Tommaso Buscetta, the first Sicilian Mafia boss who was treated by some as pentito
 Trapped: The Alex Cooper Story (2019) – biographical drama film about Alex Cooper's experience in being sent to a conversion therapy home and the brutalities she endured while there
 The Trial of Christine Keeler (2019) – British drama miniseries based on the chain of events surrounding the Profumo affair in the 1960s.
 True History of the Kelly Gang (2019) – British-Australian biographical western film based on the story of Australian bushranger Ned Kelly and his gang as they flee from authorities during the 1870s
 The Two Popes (2019) – biographical drama film predominantly set in the Vatican City in the aftermath of the Vatican leaks scandal, the film follows Pope Benedict XVI as he attempts to convince Cardinal Jorge Mario Bergoglio to reconsider his decision to resign as an archbishop as he confides his own intentions to abdicate the papacy
 Union of Salvation (Russian: Союз спасения) (2019) – Russian war epic period adventure film about veterans of the French invasion of Russia of 1812, who conspired to install Konstantin Pavlovich as the new tsar of the Russian Empire, transform Russia into a constitutional state and abolish serfdom
 Unbelievable (2019) – true crime miniseries about a series of rapes in Washington State and Colorado
 Unplanned (2019) – anti-abortion drama film based on the disputed memoir Unplanned by Abby Johnson
 Uri: The Surgical Strike (2019) – Indian Hindi-language war action film based on the true events of the retaliation to the 2016 Uri attack
 Virus (2019) – Indian Malayalam-language medical thriller film set in backdrop of the 2018 Nipah virus outbreak in Kerala
 Walk. Ride. Rodeo. (2019) – biographical film about the life of Amberley Snyder, a nationally ranked rodeo barrel racer who defies the odds to return to the sport after barely surviving a car crash that leaves her paralysed from the waist down
 The Warrior Queen of Jhansi (2019) – British period drama film on the 1857 Indian Rebellion against the British East India Company
 Wasp Network (2019) – Spy thriller film based on the true story of Cuban spies in American territory during the 1990s
 When They See Us (2019) – crime drama based on events of the 1989 Central Park jogger case and explores the lives and families of the five Black and Latino male suspects who were falsely accused then prosecuted on charges related to the rape and assault of a white woman in Central Park, New York City
 While at War (Spanish: Mientras dure la guerra) (2019) – Spanish-Argentine historical drama film following the plight of philosopher and writer Miguel de Unamuno in Salamanca, a city controlled by the Rebel faction
 Yatra ( Journey) (2019) – Indian Telugu-language biographical film based on padayatra of Reddy who served as Chief Minister of Andhra Pradesh from May 2004 to June 2009 representing Indian National Congress

References

External links 
 History at the Movies: Historical and Period Films
 Internet Movie Database list
 Films based on historical events and people

 
Actual events
Lists of historical films